

425001–425100 

|-bgcolor=#d6d6d6
| 425001 ||  || — || February 3, 2009 || Kitt Peak || Spacewatch || — || align=right | 2.8 km || 
|-id=002 bgcolor=#fefefe
| 425002 ||  || — || February 20, 2009 || Catalina || CSS || — || align=right data-sort-value="0.92" | 920 m || 
|-id=003 bgcolor=#d6d6d6
| 425003 ||  || — || February 17, 2009 || Kitt Peak || Spacewatch || — || align=right | 2.6 km || 
|-id=004 bgcolor=#d6d6d6
| 425004 ||  || — || February 18, 2009 || Wildberg || R. Apitzsch || — || align=right | 4.7 km || 
|-id=005 bgcolor=#d6d6d6
| 425005 ||  || — || February 28, 2009 || Socorro || LINEAR || — || align=right | 3.5 km || 
|-id=006 bgcolor=#fefefe
| 425006 ||  || — || February 22, 2009 || Kitt Peak || Spacewatch || — || align=right data-sort-value="0.75" | 750 m || 
|-id=007 bgcolor=#fefefe
| 425007 ||  || — || February 24, 2009 || Mount Lemmon || Mount Lemmon Survey || — || align=right data-sort-value="0.75" | 750 m || 
|-id=008 bgcolor=#fefefe
| 425008 ||  || — || February 21, 2009 || Mount Lemmon || Mount Lemmon Survey || — || align=right data-sort-value="0.65" | 650 m || 
|-id=009 bgcolor=#d6d6d6
| 425009 ||  || — || February 22, 2009 || Siding Spring || SSS || Tj (2.99) || align=right | 4.4 km || 
|-id=010 bgcolor=#d6d6d6
| 425010 ||  || — || February 28, 2009 || Kitt Peak || Spacewatch || — || align=right | 2.9 km || 
|-id=011 bgcolor=#d6d6d6
| 425011 ||  || — || February 26, 2009 || Calar Alto || F. Hormuth || 7:4 || align=right | 3.2 km || 
|-id=012 bgcolor=#d6d6d6
| 425012 ||  || — || February 19, 2009 || Kitt Peak || Spacewatch || THM || align=right | 2.5 km || 
|-id=013 bgcolor=#fefefe
| 425013 ||  || — || February 19, 2009 || Kitt Peak || Spacewatch || — || align=right data-sort-value="0.93" | 930 m || 
|-id=014 bgcolor=#d6d6d6
| 425014 ||  || — || February 19, 2009 || Kitt Peak || Spacewatch || — || align=right | 4.1 km || 
|-id=015 bgcolor=#fefefe
| 425015 ||  || — || February 19, 2009 || Kitt Peak || Spacewatch || — || align=right | 1.3 km || 
|-id=016 bgcolor=#d6d6d6
| 425016 ||  || — || March 1, 2009 || Mount Lemmon || Mount Lemmon Survey || — || align=right | 3.2 km || 
|-id=017 bgcolor=#d6d6d6
| 425017 ||  || — || March 15, 2009 || Kitt Peak || Spacewatch || — || align=right | 3.3 km || 
|-id=018 bgcolor=#d6d6d6
| 425018 ||  || — || March 15, 2009 || Mount Lemmon || Mount Lemmon Survey || (1298) || align=right | 2.7 km || 
|-id=019 bgcolor=#d6d6d6
| 425019 ||  || — || March 2, 2009 || Mount Lemmon || Mount Lemmon Survey || THB || align=right | 3.3 km || 
|-id=020 bgcolor=#fefefe
| 425020 ||  || — || March 3, 2009 || Kitt Peak || Spacewatch || — || align=right data-sort-value="0.71" | 710 m || 
|-id=021 bgcolor=#fefefe
| 425021 ||  || — || February 20, 2009 || Kitt Peak || Spacewatch || — || align=right data-sort-value="0.68" | 680 m || 
|-id=022 bgcolor=#fefefe
| 425022 ||  || — || March 16, 2009 || Kitt Peak || Spacewatch || — || align=right data-sort-value="0.75" | 750 m || 
|-id=023 bgcolor=#fefefe
| 425023 ||  || — || March 19, 2009 || Calar Alto || F. Hormuth || — || align=right data-sort-value="0.76" | 760 m || 
|-id=024 bgcolor=#fefefe
| 425024 ||  || — || March 21, 2009 || Kitt Peak || Spacewatch || — || align=right data-sort-value="0.62" | 620 m || 
|-id=025 bgcolor=#fefefe
| 425025 ||  || — || March 19, 2009 || Kitt Peak || Spacewatch || — || align=right data-sort-value="0.81" | 810 m || 
|-id=026 bgcolor=#fefefe
| 425026 ||  || — || March 18, 2009 || Mount Lemmon || Mount Lemmon Survey || — || align=right data-sort-value="0.81" | 810 m || 
|-id=027 bgcolor=#d6d6d6
| 425027 ||  || — || March 28, 2009 || Mount Lemmon || Mount Lemmon Survey || — || align=right | 4.7 km || 
|-id=028 bgcolor=#fefefe
| 425028 ||  || — || March 19, 2009 || Mount Lemmon || Mount Lemmon Survey || — || align=right data-sort-value="0.71" | 710 m || 
|-id=029 bgcolor=#fefefe
| 425029 ||  || — || March 16, 2009 || Mount Lemmon || Mount Lemmon Survey || — || align=right data-sort-value="0.68" | 680 m || 
|-id=030 bgcolor=#fefefe
| 425030 ||  || — || March 18, 2009 || Kitt Peak || Spacewatch || — || align=right data-sort-value="0.61" | 610 m || 
|-id=031 bgcolor=#fefefe
| 425031 ||  || — || April 18, 2009 || Mount Lemmon || Mount Lemmon Survey || — || align=right data-sort-value="0.59" | 590 m || 
|-id=032 bgcolor=#d6d6d6
| 425032 ||  || — || April 17, 2009 || Kitt Peak || Spacewatch || — || align=right | 3.9 km || 
|-id=033 bgcolor=#fefefe
| 425033 ||  || — || April 19, 2009 || Kitt Peak || Spacewatch || — || align=right data-sort-value="0.62" | 620 m || 
|-id=034 bgcolor=#fefefe
| 425034 ||  || — || April 24, 2009 || Mount Lemmon || Mount Lemmon Survey || — || align=right data-sort-value="0.66" | 660 m || 
|-id=035 bgcolor=#fefefe
| 425035 ||  || — || April 2, 2009 || Kitt Peak || Spacewatch || — || align=right data-sort-value="0.61" | 610 m || 
|-id=036 bgcolor=#fefefe
| 425036 ||  || — || April 18, 2009 || Kitt Peak || Spacewatch || — || align=right data-sort-value="0.70" | 700 m || 
|-id=037 bgcolor=#fefefe
| 425037 ||  || — || April 18, 2009 || Kitt Peak || Spacewatch || MAS || align=right data-sort-value="0.71" | 710 m || 
|-id=038 bgcolor=#fefefe
| 425038 ||  || — || May 26, 2009 || Kitt Peak || Spacewatch || V || align=right data-sort-value="0.76" | 760 m || 
|-id=039 bgcolor=#C2FFFF
| 425039 ||  || — || February 7, 2006 || Mount Lemmon || Mount Lemmon Survey || L5 || align=right | 8.5 km || 
|-id=040 bgcolor=#fefefe
| 425040 ||  || — || June 17, 2009 || Kitt Peak || Spacewatch || — || align=right | 1.0 km || 
|-id=041 bgcolor=#E9E9E9
| 425041 ||  || — || July 28, 2009 || La Sagra || OAM Obs. || — || align=right | 1.9 km || 
|-id=042 bgcolor=#fefefe
| 425042 || 2009 PR || — || August 13, 2009 || Dauban || F. Kugel || MAS || align=right data-sort-value="0.94" | 940 m || 
|-id=043 bgcolor=#E9E9E9
| 425043 ||  || — || August 12, 2009 || La Sagra || OAM Obs. || — || align=right | 1.8 km || 
|-id=044 bgcolor=#E9E9E9
| 425044 ||  || — || August 15, 2009 || Catalina || CSS || JUN || align=right | 1.0 km || 
|-id=045 bgcolor=#fefefe
| 425045 ||  || — || August 15, 2009 || Catalina || CSS || — || align=right data-sort-value="0.86" | 860 m || 
|-id=046 bgcolor=#E9E9E9
| 425046 ||  || — || August 16, 2009 || Kitt Peak || Spacewatch || RAF || align=right data-sort-value="0.65" | 650 m || 
|-id=047 bgcolor=#FFC2E0
| 425047 ||  || — || August 20, 2009 || Kitt Peak || Spacewatch || AMO +1km || align=right data-sort-value="0.89" | 890 m || 
|-id=048 bgcolor=#fefefe
| 425048 ||  || — || August 22, 2009 || Dauban || F. Kugel || MAS || align=right data-sort-value="0.64" | 640 m || 
|-id=049 bgcolor=#fefefe
| 425049 ||  || — || August 19, 2009 || La Sagra || OAM Obs. || — || align=right data-sort-value="0.74" | 740 m || 
|-id=050 bgcolor=#E9E9E9
| 425050 ||  || — || August 16, 2009 || Kitt Peak || Spacewatch || — || align=right | 1.3 km || 
|-id=051 bgcolor=#E9E9E9
| 425051 ||  || — || August 23, 2009 || Bergisch Gladbach || W. Bickel || — || align=right | 1.9 km || 
|-id=052 bgcolor=#E9E9E9
| 425052 ||  || — || August 23, 2009 || Wildberg || R. Apitzsch || — || align=right | 1.8 km || 
|-id=053 bgcolor=#E9E9E9
| 425053 ||  || — || August 24, 2009 || La Sagra || OAM Obs. || — || align=right | 1.4 km || 
|-id=054 bgcolor=#E9E9E9
| 425054 ||  || — || June 21, 2009 || Mount Lemmon || Mount Lemmon Survey || JUN || align=right | 1.2 km || 
|-id=055 bgcolor=#fefefe
| 425055 ||  || — || August 27, 2009 || Kitt Peak || Spacewatch || — || align=right data-sort-value="0.75" | 750 m || 
|-id=056 bgcolor=#E9E9E9
| 425056 ||  || — || March 26, 2007 || Mount Lemmon || Mount Lemmon Survey || — || align=right | 1.5 km || 
|-id=057 bgcolor=#E9E9E9
| 425057 ||  || — || August 26, 2009 || Catalina || CSS || — || align=right | 1.8 km || 
|-id=058 bgcolor=#E9E9E9
| 425058 ||  || — || August 27, 2009 || Kitt Peak || Spacewatch || — || align=right | 1.2 km || 
|-id=059 bgcolor=#E9E9E9
| 425059 ||  || — || August 28, 2009 || Socorro || LINEAR || — || align=right | 1.4 km || 
|-id=060 bgcolor=#E9E9E9
| 425060 ||  || — || August 16, 2009 || Catalina || CSS || — || align=right | 1.9 km || 
|-id=061 bgcolor=#E9E9E9
| 425061 ||  || — || September 12, 2009 || Kitt Peak || Spacewatch || — || align=right | 1.2 km || 
|-id=062 bgcolor=#E9E9E9
| 425062 ||  || — || September 12, 2009 || Kitt Peak || Spacewatch || — || align=right data-sort-value="0.85" | 850 m || 
|-id=063 bgcolor=#E9E9E9
| 425063 ||  || — || September 12, 2009 || Kitt Peak || Spacewatch || MRX || align=right data-sort-value="0.96" | 960 m || 
|-id=064 bgcolor=#E9E9E9
| 425064 ||  || — || November 1, 2005 || Mount Lemmon || Mount Lemmon Survey || — || align=right | 1.3 km || 
|-id=065 bgcolor=#E9E9E9
| 425065 ||  || — || September 12, 2009 || Kitt Peak || Spacewatch || — || align=right | 1.2 km || 
|-id=066 bgcolor=#E9E9E9
| 425066 ||  || — || September 13, 2009 || Purple Mountain || PMO NEO || — || align=right | 1.2 km || 
|-id=067 bgcolor=#fefefe
| 425067 ||  || — || September 14, 2009 || Kitt Peak || Spacewatch || — || align=right data-sort-value="0.88" | 880 m || 
|-id=068 bgcolor=#E9E9E9
| 425068 ||  || — || September 15, 2009 || Kitt Peak || Spacewatch || — || align=right data-sort-value="0.75" | 750 m || 
|-id=069 bgcolor=#E9E9E9
| 425069 ||  || — || September 15, 2009 || Kitt Peak || Spacewatch || — || align=right | 1.3 km || 
|-id=070 bgcolor=#E9E9E9
| 425070 ||  || — || September 15, 2009 || Kitt Peak || Spacewatch || — || align=right | 1.7 km || 
|-id=071 bgcolor=#E9E9E9
| 425071 ||  || — || September 15, 2009 || Kitt Peak || Spacewatch || — || align=right | 1.4 km || 
|-id=072 bgcolor=#E9E9E9
| 425072 ||  || — || September 15, 2009 || Kitt Peak || Spacewatch || — || align=right | 2.0 km || 
|-id=073 bgcolor=#E9E9E9
| 425073 ||  || — || September 10, 2009 || Catalina || CSS || — || align=right | 1.7 km || 
|-id=074 bgcolor=#E9E9E9
| 425074 ||  || — || September 15, 2009 || Catalina || CSS || — || align=right | 1.2 km || 
|-id=075 bgcolor=#E9E9E9
| 425075 ||  || — || September 15, 2009 || Kitt Peak || Spacewatch || — || align=right | 2.1 km || 
|-id=076 bgcolor=#E9E9E9
| 425076 ||  || — || September 15, 2009 || Kitt Peak || Spacewatch || — || align=right | 1.3 km || 
|-id=077 bgcolor=#fefefe
| 425077 ||  || — || September 15, 2009 || Mount Lemmon || Mount Lemmon Survey || — || align=right data-sort-value="0.94" | 940 m || 
|-id=078 bgcolor=#E9E9E9
| 425078 ||  || — || September 15, 2009 || Kitt Peak || Spacewatch || — || align=right | 1.0 km || 
|-id=079 bgcolor=#E9E9E9
| 425079 ||  || — || September 15, 2009 || Kitt Peak || Spacewatch || — || align=right | 1.1 km || 
|-id=080 bgcolor=#E9E9E9
| 425080 ||  || — || September 15, 2009 || Kitt Peak || Spacewatch || — || align=right | 1.2 km || 
|-id=081 bgcolor=#E9E9E9
| 425081 ||  || — || September 15, 2009 || Kitt Peak || Spacewatch || — || align=right | 2.1 km || 
|-id=082 bgcolor=#E9E9E9
| 425082 ||  || — || September 15, 2009 || Kitt Peak || Spacewatch || — || align=right data-sort-value="0.77" | 770 m || 
|-id=083 bgcolor=#E9E9E9
| 425083 ||  || — || September 15, 2009 || Kitt Peak || Spacewatch || — || align=right | 1.1 km || 
|-id=084 bgcolor=#E9E9E9
| 425084 ||  || — || August 18, 2009 || Catalina || CSS || — || align=right | 1.8 km || 
|-id=085 bgcolor=#E9E9E9
| 425085 ||  || — || September 19, 2009 || Bisei SG Center || BATTeRS || — || align=right | 1.4 km || 
|-id=086 bgcolor=#E9E9E9
| 425086 ||  || — || September 22, 2009 || Altschwendt || W. Ries || JUN || align=right data-sort-value="0.94" | 940 m || 
|-id=087 bgcolor=#fefefe
| 425087 ||  || — || September 16, 2009 || Kitt Peak || Spacewatch || — || align=right | 1.1 km || 
|-id=088 bgcolor=#E9E9E9
| 425088 ||  || — || September 16, 2009 || Kitt Peak || Spacewatch || — || align=right | 1.3 km || 
|-id=089 bgcolor=#E9E9E9
| 425089 ||  || — || September 16, 2009 || Kitt Peak || Spacewatch || — || align=right | 1.5 km || 
|-id=090 bgcolor=#E9E9E9
| 425090 ||  || — || September 16, 2009 || Kitt Peak || Spacewatch || — || align=right | 1.0 km || 
|-id=091 bgcolor=#E9E9E9
| 425091 ||  || — || September 16, 2009 || Kitt Peak || Spacewatch || — || align=right | 1.2 km || 
|-id=092 bgcolor=#fefefe
| 425092 ||  || — || September 16, 2009 || Kitt Peak || Spacewatch || — || align=right | 1.2 km || 
|-id=093 bgcolor=#E9E9E9
| 425093 ||  || — || September 17, 2009 || Kitt Peak || Spacewatch || — || align=right | 1.1 km || 
|-id=094 bgcolor=#E9E9E9
| 425094 ||  || — || September 17, 2009 || Kitt Peak || Spacewatch || — || align=right | 2.1 km || 
|-id=095 bgcolor=#E9E9E9
| 425095 ||  || — || September 17, 2009 || Kitt Peak || Spacewatch || — || align=right | 1.8 km || 
|-id=096 bgcolor=#E9E9E9
| 425096 ||  || — || September 17, 2009 || Kitt Peak || Spacewatch || AGN || align=right | 1.1 km || 
|-id=097 bgcolor=#fefefe
| 425097 ||  || — || September 17, 2009 || Kitt Peak || Spacewatch || — || align=right data-sort-value="0.96" | 960 m || 
|-id=098 bgcolor=#E9E9E9
| 425098 ||  || — || September 18, 2009 || Mount Lemmon || Mount Lemmon Survey || DOR || align=right | 2.1 km || 
|-id=099 bgcolor=#fefefe
| 425099 ||  || — || March 2, 2008 || Kitt Peak || Spacewatch || NYS || align=right data-sort-value="0.78" | 780 m || 
|-id=100 bgcolor=#E9E9E9
| 425100 ||  || — || September 22, 2009 || Socorro || LINEAR || — || align=right | 2.3 km || 
|}

425101–425200 

|-bgcolor=#E9E9E9
| 425101 ||  || — || September 16, 2009 || Mount Lemmon || Mount Lemmon Survey || — || align=right | 2.0 km || 
|-id=102 bgcolor=#E9E9E9
| 425102 ||  || — || September 18, 2009 || Kitt Peak || Spacewatch || — || align=right | 1.5 km || 
|-id=103 bgcolor=#E9E9E9
| 425103 ||  || — || November 10, 2005 || Kitt Peak || Spacewatch || — || align=right | 2.3 km || 
|-id=104 bgcolor=#fefefe
| 425104 ||  || — || November 1, 2005 || Mount Lemmon || Mount Lemmon Survey || — || align=right | 1.1 km || 
|-id=105 bgcolor=#E9E9E9
| 425105 ||  || — || September 18, 2009 || Kitt Peak || Spacewatch || (5) || align=right data-sort-value="0.72" | 720 m || 
|-id=106 bgcolor=#fefefe
| 425106 ||  || — || September 18, 2009 || Kitt Peak || Spacewatch || — || align=right data-sort-value="0.86" | 860 m || 
|-id=107 bgcolor=#E9E9E9
| 425107 ||  || — || September 18, 2009 || Kitt Peak || Spacewatch || (5) || align=right data-sort-value="0.69" | 690 m || 
|-id=108 bgcolor=#E9E9E9
| 425108 ||  || — || September 18, 2009 || Kitt Peak || Spacewatch || — || align=right | 1.3 km || 
|-id=109 bgcolor=#E9E9E9
| 425109 ||  || — || September 18, 2009 || Kitt Peak || Spacewatch || — || align=right | 1.1 km || 
|-id=110 bgcolor=#E9E9E9
| 425110 ||  || — || September 14, 2009 || Socorro || LINEAR || ADE || align=right | 2.1 km || 
|-id=111 bgcolor=#E9E9E9
| 425111 ||  || — || September 19, 2009 || Kitt Peak || Spacewatch || (5) || align=right data-sort-value="0.77" | 770 m || 
|-id=112 bgcolor=#E9E9E9
| 425112 ||  || — || September 19, 2009 || Kitt Peak || Spacewatch || — || align=right | 2.7 km || 
|-id=113 bgcolor=#E9E9E9
| 425113 ||  || — || September 20, 2009 || Kitt Peak || Spacewatch || — || align=right | 2.1 km || 
|-id=114 bgcolor=#E9E9E9
| 425114 ||  || — || September 20, 2009 || Kitt Peak || Spacewatch || — || align=right | 1.4 km || 
|-id=115 bgcolor=#E9E9E9
| 425115 ||  || — || September 20, 2009 || Kitt Peak || Spacewatch || — || align=right | 1.1 km || 
|-id=116 bgcolor=#E9E9E9
| 425116 ||  || — || September 23, 2009 || Mount Lemmon || Mount Lemmon Survey || — || align=right | 1.7 km || 
|-id=117 bgcolor=#E9E9E9
| 425117 ||  || — || May 3, 2008 || Mount Lemmon || Mount Lemmon Survey || — || align=right | 1.9 km || 
|-id=118 bgcolor=#E9E9E9
| 425118 ||  || — || September 4, 2000 || Anderson Mesa || LONEOS || — || align=right | 2.4 km || 
|-id=119 bgcolor=#E9E9E9
| 425119 ||  || — || September 21, 2009 || Kitt Peak || Spacewatch || — || align=right | 1.3 km || 
|-id=120 bgcolor=#E9E9E9
| 425120 ||  || — || September 21, 2009 || Kitt Peak || Spacewatch || MAR || align=right data-sort-value="0.87" | 870 m || 
|-id=121 bgcolor=#E9E9E9
| 425121 ||  || — || September 21, 2009 || Kitt Peak || Spacewatch || — || align=right | 2.7 km || 
|-id=122 bgcolor=#E9E9E9
| 425122 ||  || — || September 22, 2009 || La Sagra || OAM Obs. || — || align=right | 2.1 km || 
|-id=123 bgcolor=#fefefe
| 425123 ||  || — || September 18, 2009 || Kitt Peak || Spacewatch || — || align=right data-sort-value="0.91" | 910 m || 
|-id=124 bgcolor=#E9E9E9
| 425124 ||  || — || September 22, 2009 || Kitt Peak || Spacewatch || — || align=right | 1.9 km || 
|-id=125 bgcolor=#d6d6d6
| 425125 ||  || — || September 23, 2009 || Kitt Peak || Spacewatch || KOR || align=right | 1.2 km || 
|-id=126 bgcolor=#fefefe
| 425126 ||  || — || March 17, 2004 || Kitt Peak || Spacewatch || — || align=right data-sort-value="0.89" | 890 m || 
|-id=127 bgcolor=#E9E9E9
| 425127 ||  || — || September 23, 2009 || Kitt Peak || Spacewatch || EUN || align=right | 1.4 km || 
|-id=128 bgcolor=#E9E9E9
| 425128 ||  || — || September 24, 2009 || Kitt Peak || Spacewatch || — || align=right | 1.2 km || 
|-id=129 bgcolor=#d6d6d6
| 425129 ||  || — || September 24, 2009 || Kitt Peak || Spacewatch || — || align=right | 2.1 km || 
|-id=130 bgcolor=#E9E9E9
| 425130 ||  || — || August 17, 2009 || Catalina || CSS || — || align=right | 1.6 km || 
|-id=131 bgcolor=#d6d6d6
| 425131 ||  || — || December 25, 2005 || Kitt Peak || Spacewatch || KOR || align=right | 1.2 km || 
|-id=132 bgcolor=#E9E9E9
| 425132 ||  || — || September 18, 2009 || Catalina || CSS || — || align=right | 2.3 km || 
|-id=133 bgcolor=#E9E9E9
| 425133 ||  || — || September 17, 2009 || Mount Lemmon || Mount Lemmon Survey || — || align=right | 2.4 km || 
|-id=134 bgcolor=#E9E9E9
| 425134 ||  || — || September 16, 2009 || Catalina || CSS || — || align=right | 1.5 km || 
|-id=135 bgcolor=#E9E9E9
| 425135 ||  || — || September 17, 2009 || Catalina || CSS || — || align=right | 1.9 km || 
|-id=136 bgcolor=#E9E9E9
| 425136 ||  || — || September 17, 2009 || Catalina || CSS || — || align=right | 2.2 km || 
|-id=137 bgcolor=#E9E9E9
| 425137 ||  || — || September 18, 2009 || Kitt Peak || Spacewatch || — || align=right | 1.6 km || 
|-id=138 bgcolor=#E9E9E9
| 425138 ||  || — || September 19, 2009 || Kitt Peak || Spacewatch || — || align=right | 1.9 km || 
|-id=139 bgcolor=#E9E9E9
| 425139 ||  || — || September 21, 2009 || Catalina || CSS || — || align=right | 1.7 km || 
|-id=140 bgcolor=#E9E9E9
| 425140 ||  || — || September 23, 2009 || Mount Lemmon || Mount Lemmon Survey || — || align=right | 2.2 km || 
|-id=141 bgcolor=#fefefe
| 425141 ||  || — || September 23, 2009 || Mount Lemmon || Mount Lemmon Survey || — || align=right | 1.1 km || 
|-id=142 bgcolor=#E9E9E9
| 425142 ||  || — || September 23, 2009 || Mount Lemmon || Mount Lemmon Survey || MAR || align=right | 1.1 km || 
|-id=143 bgcolor=#fefefe
| 425143 ||  || — || September 25, 2009 || Kitt Peak || Spacewatch || — || align=right | 1.1 km || 
|-id=144 bgcolor=#E9E9E9
| 425144 ||  || — || September 25, 2009 || Kitt Peak || Spacewatch || — || align=right | 1.0 km || 
|-id=145 bgcolor=#E9E9E9
| 425145 ||  || — || September 25, 2009 || Mount Lemmon || Mount Lemmon Survey || — || align=right | 1.3 km || 
|-id=146 bgcolor=#E9E9E9
| 425146 ||  || — || September 17, 2009 || Kitt Peak || Spacewatch || — || align=right | 1.1 km || 
|-id=147 bgcolor=#E9E9E9
| 425147 ||  || — || September 27, 2009 || Mount Lemmon || Mount Lemmon Survey || — || align=right | 1.4 km || 
|-id=148 bgcolor=#E9E9E9
| 425148 ||  || — || September 28, 2009 || Catalina || CSS || — || align=right | 1.4 km || 
|-id=149 bgcolor=#E9E9E9
| 425149 ||  || — || September 22, 2009 || Mount Lemmon || Mount Lemmon Survey || — || align=right | 1.7 km || 
|-id=150 bgcolor=#E9E9E9
| 425150 ||  || — || September 26, 2009 || Kitt Peak || Spacewatch || — || align=right data-sort-value="0.97" | 970 m || 
|-id=151 bgcolor=#E9E9E9
| 425151 ||  || — || September 30, 2009 || Mount Lemmon || Mount Lemmon Survey || ADE || align=right | 1.8 km || 
|-id=152 bgcolor=#E9E9E9
| 425152 ||  || — || September 25, 2009 || Kitt Peak || Spacewatch || — || align=right | 2.5 km || 
|-id=153 bgcolor=#E9E9E9
| 425153 ||  || — || September 28, 2009 || Catalina || CSS || — || align=right | 1.9 km || 
|-id=154 bgcolor=#E9E9E9
| 425154 ||  || — || September 26, 2009 || Kitt Peak || Spacewatch || — || align=right | 3.6 km || 
|-id=155 bgcolor=#fefefe
| 425155 ||  || — || September 29, 2009 || Kitt Peak || Spacewatch || — || align=right data-sort-value="0.73" | 730 m || 
|-id=156 bgcolor=#E9E9E9
| 425156 ||  || — || August 20, 2009 || Socorro || LINEAR || — || align=right | 1.3 km || 
|-id=157 bgcolor=#E9E9E9
| 425157 ||  || — || September 23, 2009 || Mount Lemmon || Mount Lemmon Survey || — || align=right | 2.1 km || 
|-id=158 bgcolor=#E9E9E9
| 425158 ||  || — || September 20, 2009 || Mount Lemmon || Mount Lemmon Survey || — || align=right | 1.9 km || 
|-id=159 bgcolor=#E9E9E9
| 425159 ||  || — || September 18, 2009 || Catalina || CSS || EUN || align=right | 1.1 km || 
|-id=160 bgcolor=#E9E9E9
| 425160 ||  || — || September 18, 2009 || Kitt Peak || Spacewatch || — || align=right | 1.0 km || 
|-id=161 bgcolor=#E9E9E9
| 425161 ||  || — || September 26, 2009 || Catalina || CSS || — || align=right | 2.0 km || 
|-id=162 bgcolor=#fefefe
| 425162 ||  || — || September 27, 2009 || Catalina || CSS || — || align=right | 1.0 km || 
|-id=163 bgcolor=#E9E9E9
| 425163 ||  || — || September 18, 2009 || Kitt Peak || Spacewatch || — || align=right | 1.3 km || 
|-id=164 bgcolor=#fefefe
| 425164 ||  || — || July 27, 2009 || Catalina || CSS || — || align=right data-sort-value="0.99" | 990 m || 
|-id=165 bgcolor=#E9E9E9
| 425165 ||  || — || October 14, 2009 || La Sagra || OAM Obs. || — || align=right | 1.8 km || 
|-id=166 bgcolor=#E9E9E9
| 425166 ||  || — || October 15, 2009 || Jarnac || Jarnac Obs. || — || align=right | 2.8 km || 
|-id=167 bgcolor=#E9E9E9
| 425167 ||  || — || September 27, 2009 || Mount Lemmon || Mount Lemmon Survey || — || align=right | 2.8 km || 
|-id=168 bgcolor=#fefefe
| 425168 ||  || — || September 12, 2009 || Kitt Peak || Spacewatch || — || align=right data-sort-value="0.85" | 850 m || 
|-id=169 bgcolor=#E9E9E9
| 425169 ||  || — || September 29, 2005 || Kitt Peak || Spacewatch || — || align=right data-sort-value="0.99" | 990 m || 
|-id=170 bgcolor=#fefefe
| 425170 ||  || — || October 15, 2009 || Mount Lemmon || Mount Lemmon Survey || V || align=right data-sort-value="0.89" | 890 m || 
|-id=171 bgcolor=#E9E9E9
| 425171 ||  || — || October 2, 2009 || Mount Lemmon || Mount Lemmon Survey || — || align=right | 1.2 km || 
|-id=172 bgcolor=#E9E9E9
| 425172 ||  || — || October 19, 2009 || Mayhill || A. Lowe || — || align=right | 2.6 km || 
|-id=173 bgcolor=#E9E9E9
| 425173 ||  || — || September 18, 2009 || Kitt Peak || Spacewatch || AGN || align=right data-sort-value="0.98" | 980 m || 
|-id=174 bgcolor=#E9E9E9
| 425174 ||  || — || October 24, 2009 || Magdalena Ridge || W. H. Ryan || — || align=right | 2.8 km || 
|-id=175 bgcolor=#E9E9E9
| 425175 ||  || — || October 23, 2009 || BlackBird || K. Levin || — || align=right | 1.5 km || 
|-id=176 bgcolor=#E9E9E9
| 425176 ||  || — || October 16, 2009 || Mount Lemmon || Mount Lemmon Survey || — || align=right data-sort-value="0.89" | 890 m || 
|-id=177 bgcolor=#E9E9E9
| 425177 ||  || — || October 18, 2009 || Mount Lemmon || Mount Lemmon Survey || NEM || align=right | 2.2 km || 
|-id=178 bgcolor=#fefefe
| 425178 ||  || — || October 18, 2009 || Mount Lemmon || Mount Lemmon Survey || — || align=right data-sort-value="0.89" | 890 m || 
|-id=179 bgcolor=#E9E9E9
| 425179 ||  || — || October 21, 2009 || Mount Lemmon || Mount Lemmon Survey || — || align=right | 1.9 km || 
|-id=180 bgcolor=#E9E9E9
| 425180 ||  || — || October 21, 2009 || Mount Lemmon || Mount Lemmon Survey || — || align=right | 1.2 km || 
|-id=181 bgcolor=#E9E9E9
| 425181 ||  || — || October 22, 2009 || Mount Lemmon || Mount Lemmon Survey || — || align=right | 2.9 km || 
|-id=182 bgcolor=#d6d6d6
| 425182 ||  || — || October 22, 2009 || Mount Lemmon || Mount Lemmon Survey || — || align=right | 4.1 km || 
|-id=183 bgcolor=#E9E9E9
| 425183 ||  || — || September 20, 2009 || Mount Lemmon || Mount Lemmon Survey || — || align=right | 1.7 km || 
|-id=184 bgcolor=#E9E9E9
| 425184 ||  || — || September 15, 2009 || Kitt Peak || Spacewatch || — || align=right | 1.0 km || 
|-id=185 bgcolor=#E9E9E9
| 425185 ||  || — || October 1, 2009 || Mount Lemmon || Mount Lemmon Survey || EUN || align=right | 1.3 km || 
|-id=186 bgcolor=#E9E9E9
| 425186 ||  || — || November 26, 2005 || Kitt Peak || Spacewatch || — || align=right | 1.1 km || 
|-id=187 bgcolor=#E9E9E9
| 425187 ||  || — || October 21, 2009 || Mount Lemmon || Mount Lemmon Survey || JUN || align=right data-sort-value="0.85" | 850 m || 
|-id=188 bgcolor=#E9E9E9
| 425188 ||  || — || October 21, 2009 || Mount Lemmon || Mount Lemmon Survey || — || align=right | 1.1 km || 
|-id=189 bgcolor=#d6d6d6
| 425189 ||  || — || November 9, 1999 || Socorro || LINEAR || — || align=right | 2.1 km || 
|-id=190 bgcolor=#E9E9E9
| 425190 ||  || — || September 16, 2009 || Mount Lemmon || Mount Lemmon Survey || — || align=right | 1.4 km || 
|-id=191 bgcolor=#E9E9E9
| 425191 ||  || — || December 6, 2005 || Kitt Peak || Spacewatch || — || align=right | 1.6 km || 
|-id=192 bgcolor=#E9E9E9
| 425192 ||  || — || September 21, 2009 || Mount Lemmon || Mount Lemmon Survey || — || align=right | 1.3 km || 
|-id=193 bgcolor=#E9E9E9
| 425193 ||  || — || October 24, 2009 || Catalina || CSS || EUN || align=right | 1.1 km || 
|-id=194 bgcolor=#E9E9E9
| 425194 ||  || — || October 24, 2009 || Kitt Peak || Spacewatch || AEO || align=right data-sort-value="0.98" | 980 m || 
|-id=195 bgcolor=#E9E9E9
| 425195 ||  || — || October 25, 2009 || Catalina || CSS || EUN || align=right | 1.3 km || 
|-id=196 bgcolor=#d6d6d6
| 425196 ||  || — || October 24, 2009 || Kitt Peak || Spacewatch || — || align=right | 2.6 km || 
|-id=197 bgcolor=#E9E9E9
| 425197 ||  || — || September 28, 2009 || Catalina || CSS || — || align=right | 1.4 km || 
|-id=198 bgcolor=#E9E9E9
| 425198 ||  || — || October 26, 2009 || Kitt Peak || Spacewatch || — || align=right | 1.1 km || 
|-id=199 bgcolor=#E9E9E9
| 425199 ||  || — || October 18, 2009 || Mount Lemmon || Mount Lemmon Survey || — || align=right | 1.1 km || 
|-id=200 bgcolor=#E9E9E9
| 425200 ||  || — || November 8, 2009 || Kitt Peak || Spacewatch || — || align=right | 1.3 km || 
|}

425201–425300 

|-bgcolor=#E9E9E9
| 425201 ||  || — || November 8, 2009 || Kitt Peak || Spacewatch || — || align=right | 1.3 km || 
|-id=202 bgcolor=#E9E9E9
| 425202 ||  || — || September 18, 2009 || Mount Lemmon || Mount Lemmon Survey || — || align=right | 1.5 km || 
|-id=203 bgcolor=#E9E9E9
| 425203 ||  || — || December 28, 2005 || Kitt Peak || Spacewatch || — || align=right | 2.0 km || 
|-id=204 bgcolor=#E9E9E9
| 425204 ||  || — || December 25, 2005 || Kitt Peak || Spacewatch || — || align=right | 2.2 km || 
|-id=205 bgcolor=#E9E9E9
| 425205 ||  || — || December 10, 2005 || Kitt Peak || Spacewatch || — || align=right | 1.2 km || 
|-id=206 bgcolor=#E9E9E9
| 425206 ||  || — || November 9, 2009 || Mount Lemmon || Mount Lemmon Survey || — || align=right | 1.9 km || 
|-id=207 bgcolor=#E9E9E9
| 425207 ||  || — || November 9, 2009 || Mount Lemmon || Mount Lemmon Survey || NEM || align=right | 1.8 km || 
|-id=208 bgcolor=#E9E9E9
| 425208 ||  || — || November 9, 2009 || Mount Lemmon || Mount Lemmon Survey || — || align=right | 1.5 km || 
|-id=209 bgcolor=#fefefe
| 425209 ||  || — || November 10, 2009 || Mount Lemmon || Mount Lemmon Survey || — || align=right | 1.0 km || 
|-id=210 bgcolor=#E9E9E9
| 425210 ||  || — || October 24, 2009 || Catalina || CSS || — || align=right | 2.2 km || 
|-id=211 bgcolor=#E9E9E9
| 425211 ||  || — || November 11, 2009 || Socorro || LINEAR || — || align=right | 1.6 km || 
|-id=212 bgcolor=#E9E9E9
| 425212 ||  || — || November 10, 2009 || Kitt Peak || Spacewatch || — || align=right | 2.1 km || 
|-id=213 bgcolor=#E9E9E9
| 425213 ||  || — || November 10, 2009 || Mount Lemmon || Mount Lemmon Survey || — || align=right data-sort-value="0.69" | 690 m || 
|-id=214 bgcolor=#d6d6d6
| 425214 ||  || — || November 10, 2009 || Kitt Peak || Spacewatch || — || align=right | 2.8 km || 
|-id=215 bgcolor=#E9E9E9
| 425215 ||  || — || November 11, 2009 || Kitt Peak || Spacewatch || MAR || align=right | 1.1 km || 
|-id=216 bgcolor=#E9E9E9
| 425216 ||  || — || November 8, 2009 || Kitt Peak || Spacewatch || — || align=right | 1.3 km || 
|-id=217 bgcolor=#E9E9E9
| 425217 ||  || — || November 8, 2009 || Kitt Peak || Spacewatch || AST || align=right | 1.6 km || 
|-id=218 bgcolor=#E9E9E9
| 425218 ||  || — || November 8, 2009 || Kitt Peak || Spacewatch || EUN || align=right | 1.6 km || 
|-id=219 bgcolor=#E9E9E9
| 425219 ||  || — || November 9, 2009 || Kitt Peak || Spacewatch || — || align=right | 2.1 km || 
|-id=220 bgcolor=#E9E9E9
| 425220 ||  || — || November 9, 2009 || Kitt Peak || Spacewatch || NEM || align=right | 2.0 km || 
|-id=221 bgcolor=#E9E9E9
| 425221 ||  || — || November 9, 2009 || Kitt Peak || Spacewatch || — || align=right | 1.6 km || 
|-id=222 bgcolor=#E9E9E9
| 425222 ||  || — || November 9, 2009 || Kitt Peak || Spacewatch || — || align=right | 2.7 km || 
|-id=223 bgcolor=#d6d6d6
| 425223 ||  || — || September 20, 2009 || Mount Lemmon || Mount Lemmon Survey || — || align=right | 2.5 km || 
|-id=224 bgcolor=#E9E9E9
| 425224 ||  || — || November 9, 2009 || Mount Lemmon || Mount Lemmon Survey || — || align=right | 1.6 km || 
|-id=225 bgcolor=#E9E9E9
| 425225 ||  || — || September 16, 2009 || Catalina || CSS || JUN || align=right | 1.6 km || 
|-id=226 bgcolor=#d6d6d6
| 425226 ||  || — || November 10, 2009 || Kitt Peak || Spacewatch || — || align=right | 3.3 km || 
|-id=227 bgcolor=#E9E9E9
| 425227 ||  || — || November 11, 2009 || Kitt Peak || Spacewatch || — || align=right | 2.8 km || 
|-id=228 bgcolor=#E9E9E9
| 425228 ||  || — || November 11, 2009 || Kitt Peak || Spacewatch || — || align=right | 1.7 km || 
|-id=229 bgcolor=#d6d6d6
| 425229 ||  || — || November 10, 2009 || Kitt Peak || Spacewatch || — || align=right | 2.6 km || 
|-id=230 bgcolor=#E9E9E9
| 425230 ||  || — || November 10, 2009 || Kitt Peak || Spacewatch || — || align=right | 2.9 km || 
|-id=231 bgcolor=#E9E9E9
| 425231 ||  || — || September 20, 2009 || Mount Lemmon || Mount Lemmon Survey || — || align=right | 2.3 km || 
|-id=232 bgcolor=#E9E9E9
| 425232 ||  || — || October 22, 2009 || Mount Lemmon || Mount Lemmon Survey || — || align=right | 1.8 km || 
|-id=233 bgcolor=#E9E9E9
| 425233 ||  || — || November 8, 2009 || Kitt Peak || Spacewatch || DOR || align=right | 2.9 km || 
|-id=234 bgcolor=#d6d6d6
| 425234 ||  || — || November 11, 2009 || Mount Lemmon || Mount Lemmon Survey || EOS || align=right | 2.2 km || 
|-id=235 bgcolor=#E9E9E9
| 425235 ||  || — || November 18, 2009 || Plana || F. Fratev || — || align=right | 1.5 km || 
|-id=236 bgcolor=#E9E9E9
| 425236 ||  || — || November 8, 2009 || Catalina || CSS || — || align=right | 1.5 km || 
|-id=237 bgcolor=#E9E9E9
| 425237 ||  || — || November 19, 2009 || Socorro || LINEAR || (5) || align=right data-sort-value="0.98" | 980 m || 
|-id=238 bgcolor=#fefefe
| 425238 ||  || — || November 16, 2009 || Mount Lemmon || Mount Lemmon Survey || — || align=right data-sort-value="0.97" | 970 m || 
|-id=239 bgcolor=#d6d6d6
| 425239 ||  || — || October 26, 2009 || Kitt Peak || Spacewatch || — || align=right | 2.5 km || 
|-id=240 bgcolor=#d6d6d6
| 425240 ||  || — || November 17, 2009 || Mount Lemmon || Mount Lemmon Survey || KOR || align=right | 1.2 km || 
|-id=241 bgcolor=#E9E9E9
| 425241 ||  || — || November 16, 2009 || Kitt Peak || Spacewatch || MAR || align=right | 1.4 km || 
|-id=242 bgcolor=#E9E9E9
| 425242 ||  || — || November 16, 2009 || Mount Lemmon || Mount Lemmon Survey || — || align=right | 1.9 km || 
|-id=243 bgcolor=#E9E9E9
| 425243 ||  || — || March 3, 2006 || Anderson Mesa || LONEOS || — || align=right | 3.2 km || 
|-id=244 bgcolor=#E9E9E9
| 425244 ||  || — || November 9, 2009 || Kitt Peak || Spacewatch || MAR || align=right data-sort-value="0.95" | 950 m || 
|-id=245 bgcolor=#E9E9E9
| 425245 ||  || — || November 9, 2009 || Mount Lemmon || Mount Lemmon Survey || — || align=right | 2.3 km || 
|-id=246 bgcolor=#E9E9E9
| 425246 ||  || — || October 26, 2009 || Kitt Peak || Spacewatch || — || align=right | 2.1 km || 
|-id=247 bgcolor=#E9E9E9
| 425247 ||  || — || November 19, 2009 || La Sagra || OAM Obs. || — || align=right | 2.2 km || 
|-id=248 bgcolor=#E9E9E9
| 425248 ||  || — || September 20, 2009 || Kitt Peak || Spacewatch || — || align=right | 2.5 km || 
|-id=249 bgcolor=#E9E9E9
| 425249 ||  || — || June 15, 2004 || Kitt Peak || Spacewatch || — || align=right | 2.0 km || 
|-id=250 bgcolor=#FFC2E0
| 425250 ||  || — || November 23, 2009 || Mount Lemmon || Mount Lemmon Survey || AMOcritical || align=right data-sort-value="0.20" | 200 m || 
|-id=251 bgcolor=#E9E9E9
| 425251 ||  || — || November 16, 2009 || Mount Lemmon || Mount Lemmon Survey || — || align=right | 1.9 km || 
|-id=252 bgcolor=#E9E9E9
| 425252 ||  || — || November 17, 2009 || Mount Lemmon || Mount Lemmon Survey || — || align=right | 1.8 km || 
|-id=253 bgcolor=#E9E9E9
| 425253 ||  || — || October 25, 2009 || Kitt Peak || Spacewatch || MRX || align=right data-sort-value="0.98" | 980 m || 
|-id=254 bgcolor=#E9E9E9
| 425254 ||  || — || February 1, 2006 || Mount Lemmon || Mount Lemmon Survey || — || align=right | 1.6 km || 
|-id=255 bgcolor=#d6d6d6
| 425255 ||  || — || November 18, 2004 || Campo Imperatore || CINEOS || — || align=right | 3.2 km || 
|-id=256 bgcolor=#fefefe
| 425256 ||  || — || November 18, 2009 || Mount Lemmon || Mount Lemmon Survey || — || align=right data-sort-value="0.89" | 890 m || 
|-id=257 bgcolor=#E9E9E9
| 425257 ||  || — || November 18, 2009 || Mount Lemmon || Mount Lemmon Survey || — || align=right | 1.6 km || 
|-id=258 bgcolor=#E9E9E9
| 425258 ||  || — || November 19, 2009 || Kitt Peak || Spacewatch || — || align=right | 1.5 km || 
|-id=259 bgcolor=#E9E9E9
| 425259 ||  || — || November 19, 2009 || Kitt Peak || Spacewatch || — || align=right | 2.5 km || 
|-id=260 bgcolor=#E9E9E9
| 425260 ||  || — || November 19, 2009 || Kitt Peak || Spacewatch || WIT || align=right data-sort-value="0.81" | 810 m || 
|-id=261 bgcolor=#E9E9E9
| 425261 ||  || — || November 19, 2009 || Kitt Peak || Spacewatch || — || align=right | 2.9 km || 
|-id=262 bgcolor=#d6d6d6
| 425262 ||  || — || November 19, 2009 || Kitt Peak || Spacewatch || — || align=right | 3.5 km || 
|-id=263 bgcolor=#d6d6d6
| 425263 ||  || — || November 19, 2009 || Kitt Peak || Spacewatch || — || align=right | 3.1 km || 
|-id=264 bgcolor=#E9E9E9
| 425264 ||  || — || November 20, 2009 || Mount Lemmon || Mount Lemmon Survey || — || align=right | 1.8 km || 
|-id=265 bgcolor=#E9E9E9
| 425265 ||  || — || December 30, 2005 || Mount Lemmon || Mount Lemmon Survey || — || align=right | 2.7 km || 
|-id=266 bgcolor=#E9E9E9
| 425266 ||  || — || November 18, 2009 || Kitt Peak || Spacewatch || — || align=right | 1.7 km || 
|-id=267 bgcolor=#E9E9E9
| 425267 ||  || — || November 18, 2009 || Mount Lemmon || Mount Lemmon Survey || — || align=right | 1.3 km || 
|-id=268 bgcolor=#d6d6d6
| 425268 ||  || — || September 30, 2003 || Kitt Peak || Spacewatch || — || align=right | 3.1 km || 
|-id=269 bgcolor=#d6d6d6
| 425269 ||  || — || November 20, 2009 || Kitt Peak || Spacewatch || EOS || align=right | 2.0 km || 
|-id=270 bgcolor=#fefefe
| 425270 ||  || — || November 20, 2009 || Kitt Peak || Spacewatch || — || align=right data-sort-value="0.94" | 940 m || 
|-id=271 bgcolor=#E9E9E9
| 425271 ||  || — || October 9, 2004 || Kitt Peak || Spacewatch || — || align=right | 2.2 km || 
|-id=272 bgcolor=#E9E9E9
| 425272 ||  || — || October 23, 2009 || Mount Lemmon || Mount Lemmon Survey || — || align=right | 2.7 km || 
|-id=273 bgcolor=#E9E9E9
| 425273 ||  || — || October 27, 2009 || Kitt Peak || Spacewatch || — || align=right | 1.2 km || 
|-id=274 bgcolor=#E9E9E9
| 425274 ||  || — || November 18, 2009 || Mount Lemmon || Mount Lemmon Survey || — || align=right | 2.4 km || 
|-id=275 bgcolor=#E9E9E9
| 425275 ||  || — || November 19, 2009 || Kitt Peak || Spacewatch || — || align=right | 2.1 km || 
|-id=276 bgcolor=#E9E9E9
| 425276 ||  || — || October 25, 2009 || Kitt Peak || Spacewatch || — || align=right | 1.4 km || 
|-id=277 bgcolor=#E9E9E9
| 425277 ||  || — || November 10, 2009 || Mount Lemmon || Mount Lemmon Survey || (5) || align=right | 1.1 km || 
|-id=278 bgcolor=#E9E9E9
| 425278 ||  || — || November 23, 2009 || Sandlot || G. Hug || — || align=right | 1.4 km || 
|-id=279 bgcolor=#E9E9E9
| 425279 ||  || — || November 23, 2009 || Kitt Peak || Spacewatch || ADE || align=right | 2.3 km || 
|-id=280 bgcolor=#E9E9E9
| 425280 ||  || — || November 23, 2009 || Kitt Peak || Spacewatch || NEM || align=right | 2.3 km || 
|-id=281 bgcolor=#E9E9E9
| 425281 ||  || — || November 23, 2009 || Kitt Peak || Spacewatch || — || align=right | 2.8 km || 
|-id=282 bgcolor=#E9E9E9
| 425282 ||  || — || August 18, 2009 || Kitt Peak || Spacewatch || — || align=right | 1.5 km || 
|-id=283 bgcolor=#E9E9E9
| 425283 ||  || — || October 30, 2009 || Mount Lemmon || Mount Lemmon Survey || — || align=right | 1.4 km || 
|-id=284 bgcolor=#E9E9E9
| 425284 ||  || — || November 24, 2009 || Kitt Peak || Spacewatch || — || align=right | 1.5 km || 
|-id=285 bgcolor=#E9E9E9
| 425285 ||  || — || November 9, 2009 || Kitt Peak || Spacewatch || — || align=right | 2.1 km || 
|-id=286 bgcolor=#d6d6d6
| 425286 ||  || — || November 9, 2009 || Catalina || CSS || — || align=right | 3.4 km || 
|-id=287 bgcolor=#E9E9E9
| 425287 ||  || — || November 17, 2009 || Kitt Peak || Spacewatch || — || align=right | 2.0 km || 
|-id=288 bgcolor=#E9E9E9
| 425288 ||  || — || November 17, 2009 || Kitt Peak || Spacewatch || AEO || align=right | 1.1 km || 
|-id=289 bgcolor=#E9E9E9
| 425289 ||  || — || November 17, 2009 || Kitt Peak || Spacewatch || — || align=right | 2.2 km || 
|-id=290 bgcolor=#E9E9E9
| 425290 ||  || — || November 18, 2009 || Kitt Peak || Spacewatch || — || align=right | 1.5 km || 
|-id=291 bgcolor=#E9E9E9
| 425291 ||  || — || November 18, 2009 || La Sagra || OAM Obs. || JUN || align=right | 1.3 km || 
|-id=292 bgcolor=#E9E9E9
| 425292 ||  || — || October 16, 2009 || Socorro || LINEAR || EUN || align=right | 1.3 km || 
|-id=293 bgcolor=#d6d6d6
| 425293 ||  || — || November 16, 2009 || Mount Lemmon || Mount Lemmon Survey || — || align=right | 5.8 km || 
|-id=294 bgcolor=#E9E9E9
| 425294 ||  || — || November 17, 2009 || Kitt Peak || Spacewatch || — || align=right | 1.5 km || 
|-id=295 bgcolor=#E9E9E9
| 425295 ||  || — || October 12, 2009 || Mount Lemmon || Mount Lemmon Survey || — || align=right | 2.5 km || 
|-id=296 bgcolor=#d6d6d6
| 425296 ||  || — || November 21, 2009 || Mount Lemmon || Mount Lemmon Survey || EOS || align=right | 2.4 km || 
|-id=297 bgcolor=#d6d6d6
| 425297 ||  || — || December 9, 2009 || La Sagra || OAM Obs. || — || align=right | 1.9 km || 
|-id=298 bgcolor=#d6d6d6
| 425298 ||  || — || December 15, 2009 || Mount Lemmon || Mount Lemmon Survey || EOS || align=right | 2.0 km || 
|-id=299 bgcolor=#E9E9E9
| 425299 ||  || — || December 15, 2009 || Mount Lemmon || Mount Lemmon Survey || — || align=right | 2.1 km || 
|-id=300 bgcolor=#E9E9E9
| 425300 ||  || — || December 15, 2009 || Bergisch Gladbac || W. Bickel || ADE || align=right | 2.7 km || 
|}

425301–425400 

|-bgcolor=#d6d6d6
| 425301 ||  || — || October 1, 2003 || Kitt Peak || Spacewatch || — || align=right | 2.1 km || 
|-id=302 bgcolor=#E9E9E9
| 425302 ||  || — || December 10, 2009 || Socorro || LINEAR || — || align=right | 2.5 km || 
|-id=303 bgcolor=#fefefe
| 425303 ||  || — || September 27, 2009 || Kitt Peak || Spacewatch || — || align=right data-sort-value="0.98" | 980 m || 
|-id=304 bgcolor=#d6d6d6
| 425304 ||  || — || December 17, 2009 || Mount Lemmon || Mount Lemmon Survey || — || align=right | 2.8 km || 
|-id=305 bgcolor=#E9E9E9
| 425305 ||  || — || September 20, 2009 || Kitt Peak || Spacewatch || — || align=right | 2.3 km || 
|-id=306 bgcolor=#E9E9E9
| 425306 ||  || — || December 18, 2009 || Mount Lemmon || Mount Lemmon Survey || — || align=right | 2.7 km || 
|-id=307 bgcolor=#d6d6d6
| 425307 ||  || — || December 18, 2009 || Mount Lemmon || Mount Lemmon Survey || — || align=right | 3.7 km || 
|-id=308 bgcolor=#d6d6d6
| 425308 ||  || — || December 18, 2009 || Mount Lemmon || Mount Lemmon Survey || — || align=right | 4.4 km || 
|-id=309 bgcolor=#E9E9E9
| 425309 ||  || — || December 20, 2009 || Kitt Peak || Spacewatch || — || align=right | 2.4 km || 
|-id=310 bgcolor=#E9E9E9
| 425310 ||  || — || January 26, 2006 || Mount Lemmon || Mount Lemmon Survey || — || align=right | 2.4 km || 
|-id=311 bgcolor=#d6d6d6
| 425311 ||  || — || March 9, 2005 || Catalina || CSS || — || align=right | 2.6 km || 
|-id=312 bgcolor=#d6d6d6
| 425312 ||  || — || December 19, 2009 || Kitt Peak || Spacewatch || VER || align=right | 4.1 km || 
|-id=313 bgcolor=#d6d6d6
| 425313 ||  || — || January 6, 2010 || Bisei SG Center || BATTeRS || — || align=right | 3.8 km || 
|-id=314 bgcolor=#d6d6d6
| 425314 ||  || — || December 20, 2009 || Kitt Peak || Spacewatch || — || align=right | 3.1 km || 
|-id=315 bgcolor=#d6d6d6
| 425315 ||  || — || January 6, 2010 || Kitt Peak || Spacewatch || — || align=right | 6.1 km || 
|-id=316 bgcolor=#d6d6d6
| 425316 ||  || — || January 6, 2010 || Kitt Peak || Spacewatch || — || align=right | 2.1 km || 
|-id=317 bgcolor=#d6d6d6
| 425317 ||  || — || January 6, 2010 || Catalina || CSS || — || align=right | 2.7 km || 
|-id=318 bgcolor=#d6d6d6
| 425318 ||  || — || January 7, 2010 || Mount Lemmon || Mount Lemmon Survey || — || align=right | 2.4 km || 
|-id=319 bgcolor=#d6d6d6
| 425319 ||  || — || January 7, 2010 || Kitt Peak || Spacewatch || HYG || align=right | 3.3 km || 
|-id=320 bgcolor=#d6d6d6
| 425320 ||  || — || January 6, 2010 || Kitt Peak || Spacewatch || HYG || align=right | 3.0 km || 
|-id=321 bgcolor=#E9E9E9
| 425321 ||  || — || January 7, 2010 || Kitt Peak || Spacewatch || — || align=right | 2.9 km || 
|-id=322 bgcolor=#d6d6d6
| 425322 ||  || — || January 8, 2010 || Kitt Peak || Spacewatch || — || align=right | 2.6 km || 
|-id=323 bgcolor=#d6d6d6
| 425323 ||  || — || January 8, 2010 || Kitt Peak || Spacewatch || — || align=right | 4.1 km || 
|-id=324 bgcolor=#d6d6d6
| 425324 ||  || — || January 8, 2010 || Mount Lemmon || Mount Lemmon Survey || — || align=right | 3.0 km || 
|-id=325 bgcolor=#E9E9E9
| 425325 ||  || — || March 2, 2006 || Kitt Peak || Spacewatch || — || align=right | 1.9 km || 
|-id=326 bgcolor=#d6d6d6
| 425326 ||  || — || January 8, 2010 || Kitt Peak || Spacewatch || — || align=right | 3.9 km || 
|-id=327 bgcolor=#d6d6d6
| 425327 ||  || — || January 8, 2010 || Kitt Peak || Spacewatch || — || align=right | 2.2 km || 
|-id=328 bgcolor=#d6d6d6
| 425328 ||  || — || January 15, 2005 || Kitt Peak || Spacewatch || — || align=right | 2.4 km || 
|-id=329 bgcolor=#d6d6d6
| 425329 ||  || — || January 11, 2010 || Kitt Peak || Spacewatch || — || align=right | 4.4 km || 
|-id=330 bgcolor=#fefefe
| 425330 ||  || — || January 7, 2010 || Catalina || CSS || H || align=right | 1.1 km || 
|-id=331 bgcolor=#E9E9E9
| 425331 ||  || — || November 21, 2009 || Mount Lemmon || Mount Lemmon Survey || — || align=right | 2.3 km || 
|-id=332 bgcolor=#d6d6d6
| 425332 ||  || — || January 11, 2010 || Kitt Peak || Spacewatch || — || align=right | 4.7 km || 
|-id=333 bgcolor=#fefefe
| 425333 ||  || — || January 8, 2010 || Catalina || CSS || H || align=right data-sort-value="0.82" | 820 m || 
|-id=334 bgcolor=#d6d6d6
| 425334 ||  || — || October 3, 2003 || Kitt Peak || Spacewatch || EOS || align=right | 2.0 km || 
|-id=335 bgcolor=#d6d6d6
| 425335 ||  || — || April 13, 2005 || Catalina || CSS || — || align=right | 3.2 km || 
|-id=336 bgcolor=#d6d6d6
| 425336 ||  || — || January 8, 2010 || WISE || WISE || — || align=right | 4.6 km || 
|-id=337 bgcolor=#d6d6d6
| 425337 ||  || — || January 12, 2010 || WISE || WISE || — || align=right | 4.2 km || 
|-id=338 bgcolor=#d6d6d6
| 425338 ||  || — || December 1, 2008 || Kitt Peak || Spacewatch || — || align=right | 2.3 km || 
|-id=339 bgcolor=#d6d6d6
| 425339 ||  || — || January 13, 2010 || WISE || WISE || — || align=right | 3.7 km || 
|-id=340 bgcolor=#d6d6d6
| 425340 ||  || — || January 13, 2010 || WISE || WISE || — || align=right | 4.9 km || 
|-id=341 bgcolor=#d6d6d6
| 425341 ||  || — || January 14, 2010 || WISE || WISE || — || align=right | 3.5 km || 
|-id=342 bgcolor=#d6d6d6
| 425342 ||  || — || January 11, 2010 || Kitt Peak || Spacewatch || LIX || align=right | 3.6 km || 
|-id=343 bgcolor=#E9E9E9
| 425343 ||  || — || September 21, 2008 || Kitt Peak || Spacewatch || AGN || align=right | 2.0 km || 
|-id=344 bgcolor=#d6d6d6
| 425344 ||  || — || January 17, 2010 || Kitt Peak || Spacewatch ||  || align=right | 3.3 km || 
|-id=345 bgcolor=#d6d6d6
| 425345 ||  || — || January 17, 2010 || WISE || WISE || THB || align=right | 3.1 km || 
|-id=346 bgcolor=#d6d6d6
| 425346 ||  || — || January 17, 2010 || WISE || WISE || — || align=right | 4.0 km || 
|-id=347 bgcolor=#d6d6d6
| 425347 ||  || — || January 18, 2010 || WISE || WISE || — || align=right | 2.6 km || 
|-id=348 bgcolor=#C2FFFF
| 425348 ||  || — || September 6, 2008 || Kitt Peak || Spacewatch || L4 || align=right | 10 km || 
|-id=349 bgcolor=#d6d6d6
| 425349 ||  || — || October 30, 2008 || Mount Lemmon || Mount Lemmon Survey || VER || align=right | 3.5 km || 
|-id=350 bgcolor=#d6d6d6
| 425350 ||  || — || January 19, 2010 || WISE || WISE || — || align=right | 4.0 km || 
|-id=351 bgcolor=#d6d6d6
| 425351 ||  || — || January 19, 2010 || WISE || WISE || — || align=right | 3.4 km || 
|-id=352 bgcolor=#d6d6d6
| 425352 ||  || — || October 20, 2007 || Mount Lemmon || Mount Lemmon Survey || URS || align=right | 4.1 km || 
|-id=353 bgcolor=#E9E9E9
| 425353 ||  || — || September 24, 2009 || Catalina || CSS || — || align=right | 1.7 km || 
|-id=354 bgcolor=#d6d6d6
| 425354 ||  || — || January 20, 2010 || WISE || WISE || — || align=right | 4.7 km || 
|-id=355 bgcolor=#d6d6d6
| 425355 ||  || — || March 17, 2004 || Socorro || LINEAR || — || align=right | 5.8 km || 
|-id=356 bgcolor=#d6d6d6
| 425356 ||  || — || March 15, 2004 || Kitt Peak || Spacewatch || — || align=right | 4.3 km || 
|-id=357 bgcolor=#d6d6d6
| 425357 ||  || — || January 22, 2010 || WISE || WISE || URS || align=right | 3.6 km || 
|-id=358 bgcolor=#d6d6d6
| 425358 ||  || — || January 15, 2009 || Kitt Peak || Spacewatch || — || align=right | 2.3 km || 
|-id=359 bgcolor=#d6d6d6
| 425359 ||  || — || January 24, 2010 || WISE || WISE || SYL7:4 || align=right | 6.8 km || 
|-id=360 bgcolor=#d6d6d6
| 425360 ||  || — || May 4, 2005 || Kitt Peak || Spacewatch || — || align=right | 3.5 km || 
|-id=361 bgcolor=#d6d6d6
| 425361 ||  || — || September 16, 2006 || Catalina || CSS || — || align=right | 5.6 km || 
|-id=362 bgcolor=#d6d6d6
| 425362 ||  || — || October 9, 2002 || Kitt Peak || Spacewatch || — || align=right | 3.0 km || 
|-id=363 bgcolor=#d6d6d6
| 425363 ||  || — || October 21, 2006 || Kitt Peak || Spacewatch || — || align=right | 4.1 km || 
|-id=364 bgcolor=#d6d6d6
| 425364 ||  || — || September 15, 2006 || Kitt Peak || Spacewatch || — || align=right | 3.6 km || 
|-id=365 bgcolor=#E9E9E9
| 425365 ||  || — || October 26, 2009 || Mount Lemmon || Mount Lemmon Survey || — || align=right | 2.8 km || 
|-id=366 bgcolor=#d6d6d6
| 425366 ||  || — || February 5, 2010 || Kitt Peak || Spacewatch || — || align=right | 3.5 km || 
|-id=367 bgcolor=#fefefe
| 425367 ||  || — || February 5, 2010 || Kitt Peak || Spacewatch || H || align=right data-sort-value="0.64" | 640 m || 
|-id=368 bgcolor=#E9E9E9
| 425368 ||  || — || November 16, 2009 || Kitt Peak || Spacewatch || — || align=right | 3.0 km || 
|-id=369 bgcolor=#d6d6d6
| 425369 ||  || — || February 6, 2010 || WISE || WISE || — || align=right | 4.5 km || 
|-id=370 bgcolor=#d6d6d6
| 425370 ||  || — || February 6, 2010 || WISE || WISE || — || align=right | 5.1 km || 
|-id=371 bgcolor=#d6d6d6
| 425371 ||  || — || January 7, 2010 || Kitt Peak || Spacewatch || — || align=right | 2.5 km || 
|-id=372 bgcolor=#d6d6d6
| 425372 ||  || — || February 9, 2010 || Kitt Peak || Spacewatch || — || align=right | 2.9 km || 
|-id=373 bgcolor=#d6d6d6
| 425373 ||  || — || February 9, 2010 || Mount Lemmon || Mount Lemmon Survey || — || align=right | 4.1 km || 
|-id=374 bgcolor=#d6d6d6
| 425374 ||  || — || February 6, 2010 || Mount Lemmon || Mount Lemmon Survey || — || align=right | 3.7 km || 
|-id=375 bgcolor=#d6d6d6
| 425375 ||  || — || February 10, 2010 || Kitt Peak || Spacewatch || — || align=right | 2.9 km || 
|-id=376 bgcolor=#d6d6d6
| 425376 ||  || — || February 10, 2010 || Kitt Peak || Spacewatch || — || align=right | 3.6 km || 
|-id=377 bgcolor=#d6d6d6
| 425377 ||  || — || January 8, 2010 || Mount Lemmon || Mount Lemmon Survey || — || align=right | 5.0 km || 
|-id=378 bgcolor=#d6d6d6
| 425378 ||  || — || December 20, 2009 || Mount Lemmon || Mount Lemmon Survey || EMA || align=right | 3.7 km || 
|-id=379 bgcolor=#d6d6d6
| 425379 ||  || — || February 13, 2010 || Mount Lemmon || Mount Lemmon Survey || — || align=right | 2.2 km || 
|-id=380 bgcolor=#E9E9E9
| 425380 ||  || — || February 6, 2010 || Mount Lemmon || Mount Lemmon Survey || — || align=right | 2.6 km || 
|-id=381 bgcolor=#d6d6d6
| 425381 ||  || — || February 13, 2010 || Nogales || L. Elenin || — || align=right | 2.8 km || 
|-id=382 bgcolor=#d6d6d6
| 425382 ||  || — || February 11, 2010 || WISE || WISE || — || align=right | 4.6 km || 
|-id=383 bgcolor=#d6d6d6
| 425383 ||  || — || February 12, 2010 || WISE || WISE || LIX || align=right | 4.0 km || 
|-id=384 bgcolor=#d6d6d6
| 425384 ||  || — || January 12, 2010 || Mount Lemmon || Mount Lemmon Survey || — || align=right | 3.1 km || 
|-id=385 bgcolor=#d6d6d6
| 425385 ||  || — || November 20, 2009 || Kitt Peak || Spacewatch || — || align=right | 3.7 km || 
|-id=386 bgcolor=#d6d6d6
| 425386 ||  || — || February 14, 2010 || Socorro || LINEAR || — || align=right | 2.6 km || 
|-id=387 bgcolor=#d6d6d6
| 425387 ||  || — || February 9, 2010 || Kitt Peak || Spacewatch || — || align=right | 3.7 km || 
|-id=388 bgcolor=#d6d6d6
| 425388 ||  || — || February 9, 2010 || Kitt Peak || Spacewatch || — || align=right | 4.2 km || 
|-id=389 bgcolor=#d6d6d6
| 425389 ||  || — || April 1, 2005 || Kitt Peak || Spacewatch || — || align=right | 3.2 km || 
|-id=390 bgcolor=#d6d6d6
| 425390 ||  || — || February 9, 2010 || Catalina || CSS || — || align=right | 3.4 km || 
|-id=391 bgcolor=#d6d6d6
| 425391 ||  || — || March 9, 2005 || Mount Lemmon || Mount Lemmon Survey || — || align=right | 2.5 km || 
|-id=392 bgcolor=#d6d6d6
| 425392 ||  || — || February 10, 2010 || Kitt Peak || Spacewatch || — || align=right | 3.2 km || 
|-id=393 bgcolor=#d6d6d6
| 425393 ||  || — || February 13, 2010 || Mount Lemmon || Mount Lemmon Survey || LIX || align=right | 3.4 km || 
|-id=394 bgcolor=#d6d6d6
| 425394 ||  || — || February 13, 2010 || Kitt Peak || Spacewatch || BRA || align=right | 1.4 km || 
|-id=395 bgcolor=#d6d6d6
| 425395 ||  || — || February 13, 2010 || Mount Lemmon || Mount Lemmon Survey || — || align=right | 3.1 km || 
|-id=396 bgcolor=#d6d6d6
| 425396 ||  || — || October 31, 2008 || Kitt Peak || Spacewatch || — || align=right | 2.3 km || 
|-id=397 bgcolor=#d6d6d6
| 425397 ||  || — || February 13, 2010 || Mount Lemmon || Mount Lemmon Survey || — || align=right | 5.1 km || 
|-id=398 bgcolor=#d6d6d6
| 425398 ||  || — || February 12, 1999 || Kitt Peak || Spacewatch || — || align=right | 2.6 km || 
|-id=399 bgcolor=#d6d6d6
| 425399 ||  || — || February 14, 2010 || Kitt Peak || Spacewatch || — || align=right | 2.5 km || 
|-id=400 bgcolor=#d6d6d6
| 425400 ||  || — || February 14, 2010 || Kitt Peak || Spacewatch || — || align=right | 2.2 km || 
|}

425401–425500 

|-bgcolor=#d6d6d6
| 425401 ||  || — || February 14, 2010 || Kitt Peak || Spacewatch || — || align=right | 3.4 km || 
|-id=402 bgcolor=#d6d6d6
| 425402 ||  || — || February 14, 2010 || Kitt Peak || Spacewatch || — || align=right | 2.3 km || 
|-id=403 bgcolor=#d6d6d6
| 425403 ||  || — || February 14, 2010 || Kitt Peak || Spacewatch || — || align=right | 2.3 km || 
|-id=404 bgcolor=#d6d6d6
| 425404 ||  || — || January 18, 1994 || Kitt Peak || Spacewatch || — || align=right | 2.3 km || 
|-id=405 bgcolor=#d6d6d6
| 425405 ||  || — || January 19, 2005 || Kitt Peak || Spacewatch || KOR || align=right | 1.4 km || 
|-id=406 bgcolor=#d6d6d6
| 425406 ||  || — || February 15, 2010 || Kitt Peak || Spacewatch || — || align=right | 2.6 km || 
|-id=407 bgcolor=#d6d6d6
| 425407 ||  || — || December 19, 2009 || Mount Lemmon || Mount Lemmon Survey || EOS || align=right | 2.1 km || 
|-id=408 bgcolor=#d6d6d6
| 425408 ||  || — || February 13, 2010 || Catalina || CSS || — || align=right | 4.2 km || 
|-id=409 bgcolor=#d6d6d6
| 425409 ||  || — || February 6, 2010 || Mount Lemmon || Mount Lemmon Survey || — || align=right | 4.0 km || 
|-id=410 bgcolor=#fefefe
| 425410 ||  || — || February 14, 2010 || Catalina || CSS || H || align=right data-sort-value="0.79" | 790 m || 
|-id=411 bgcolor=#d6d6d6
| 425411 ||  || — || October 1, 2008 || Mount Lemmon || Mount Lemmon Survey || — || align=right | 2.1 km || 
|-id=412 bgcolor=#d6d6d6
| 425412 ||  || — || February 15, 2010 || Kitt Peak || Spacewatch || — || align=right | 3.3 km || 
|-id=413 bgcolor=#d6d6d6
| 425413 ||  || — || February 15, 2010 || Mount Lemmon || Mount Lemmon Survey || — || align=right | 2.3 km || 
|-id=414 bgcolor=#d6d6d6
| 425414 ||  || — || February 6, 2010 || Mount Lemmon || Mount Lemmon Survey || — || align=right | 2.7 km || 
|-id=415 bgcolor=#d6d6d6
| 425415 ||  || — || February 6, 2010 || Kitt Peak || Spacewatch || THM || align=right | 2.2 km || 
|-id=416 bgcolor=#d6d6d6
| 425416 ||  || — || February 6, 2010 || Kitt Peak || Spacewatch || EOS || align=right | 1.9 km || 
|-id=417 bgcolor=#d6d6d6
| 425417 ||  || — || January 11, 2010 || Kitt Peak || Spacewatch || — || align=right | 4.6 km || 
|-id=418 bgcolor=#d6d6d6
| 425418 ||  || — || February 10, 2010 || Kitt Peak || Spacewatch || — || align=right | 3.1 km || 
|-id=419 bgcolor=#E9E9E9
| 425419 ||  || — || June 21, 2007 || Mount Lemmon || Mount Lemmon Survey || WIT || align=right | 1.2 km || 
|-id=420 bgcolor=#d6d6d6
| 425420 ||  || — || October 23, 2009 || Mount Lemmon || Mount Lemmon Survey || — || align=right | 3.8 km || 
|-id=421 bgcolor=#d6d6d6
| 425421 ||  || — || February 13, 2010 || Mount Lemmon || Mount Lemmon Survey || — || align=right | 3.5 km || 
|-id=422 bgcolor=#d6d6d6
| 425422 ||  || — || January 29, 2009 || Mount Lemmon || Mount Lemmon Survey || — || align=right | 3.6 km || 
|-id=423 bgcolor=#E9E9E9
| 425423 ||  || — || September 10, 2007 || Mount Lemmon || Mount Lemmon Survey || NEM || align=right | 2.2 km || 
|-id=424 bgcolor=#d6d6d6
| 425424 ||  || — || March 9, 2005 || Mount Lemmon || Mount Lemmon Survey || — || align=right | 2.5 km || 
|-id=425 bgcolor=#d6d6d6
| 425425 ||  || — || February 16, 2010 || Kitt Peak || Spacewatch || — || align=right | 3.1 km || 
|-id=426 bgcolor=#d6d6d6
| 425426 ||  || — || February 19, 2010 || Magdalena Ridge || W. H. Ryan || — || align=right | 3.7 km || 
|-id=427 bgcolor=#d6d6d6
| 425427 ||  || — || February 14, 2010 || Catalina || CSS || — || align=right | 5.6 km || 
|-id=428 bgcolor=#d6d6d6
| 425428 ||  || — || March 8, 2005 || Kitt Peak || Spacewatch || — || align=right | 2.8 km || 
|-id=429 bgcolor=#d6d6d6
| 425429 ||  || — || February 17, 2010 || Kitt Peak || Spacewatch || VER || align=right | 2.6 km || 
|-id=430 bgcolor=#d6d6d6
| 425430 ||  || — || February 17, 2010 || Kitt Peak || Spacewatch || — || align=right | 3.0 km || 
|-id=431 bgcolor=#d6d6d6
| 425431 ||  || — || February 6, 2010 || Kitt Peak || Spacewatch || EOS || align=right | 2.0 km || 
|-id=432 bgcolor=#fefefe
| 425432 ||  || — || February 18, 2010 || Kitt Peak || Spacewatch || H || align=right data-sort-value="0.62" | 620 m || 
|-id=433 bgcolor=#d6d6d6
| 425433 ||  || — || February 18, 2010 || Kitt Peak || Spacewatch || — || align=right | 3.1 km || 
|-id=434 bgcolor=#d6d6d6
| 425434 ||  || — || February 21, 2010 || WISE || WISE || THB || align=right | 3.8 km || 
|-id=435 bgcolor=#d6d6d6
| 425435 ||  || — || February 23, 2010 || WISE || WISE || Tj (2.95) || align=right | 3.5 km || 
|-id=436 bgcolor=#E9E9E9
| 425436 ||  || — || September 30, 2009 || Mount Lemmon || Mount Lemmon Survey || — || align=right | 2.7 km || 
|-id=437 bgcolor=#d6d6d6
| 425437 ||  || — || August 25, 2001 || Kitt Peak || Spacewatch || — || align=right | 2.9 km || 
|-id=438 bgcolor=#d6d6d6
| 425438 ||  || — || October 8, 2007 || Catalina || CSS || — || align=right | 3.3 km || 
|-id=439 bgcolor=#fefefe
| 425439 ||  || — || March 9, 2005 || Kitt Peak || Spacewatch || H || align=right data-sort-value="0.93" | 930 m || 
|-id=440 bgcolor=#d6d6d6
| 425440 ||  || — || February 20, 2010 || Vail-Jarnac || Jarnac Obs. || LIX || align=right | 4.4 km || 
|-id=441 bgcolor=#d6d6d6
| 425441 ||  || — || March 13, 2005 || Mount Lemmon || Mount Lemmon Survey || — || align=right | 2.4 km || 
|-id=442 bgcolor=#d6d6d6
| 425442 Eberstadt ||  ||  || March 7, 2010 || Bergen-Enkheim || U. Süßenberger || — || align=right | 2.2 km || 
|-id=443 bgcolor=#d6d6d6
| 425443 ||  || — || August 24, 2007 || Kitt Peak || Spacewatch || — || align=right | 2.0 km || 
|-id=444 bgcolor=#d6d6d6
| 425444 ||  || — || March 4, 2010 || Kitt Peak || Spacewatch || THM || align=right | 2.4 km || 
|-id=445 bgcolor=#d6d6d6
| 425445 ||  || — || September 12, 2007 || Mount Lemmon || Mount Lemmon Survey || — || align=right | 3.2 km || 
|-id=446 bgcolor=#E9E9E9
| 425446 ||  || — || March 12, 2010 || Kachina || J. Hobart || — || align=right | 2.5 km || 
|-id=447 bgcolor=#E9E9E9
| 425447 ||  || — || December 19, 2004 || Anderson Mesa || LONEOS || — || align=right | 2.6 km || 
|-id=448 bgcolor=#d6d6d6
| 425448 ||  || — || March 13, 2010 || Dauban || F. Kugel || — || align=right | 3.0 km || 
|-id=449 bgcolor=#d6d6d6
| 425449 ||  || — || March 14, 2010 || Dauban || F. Kugel || — || align=right | 4.2 km || 
|-id=450 bgcolor=#FFC2E0
| 425450 ||  || — || March 15, 2010 || La Sagra || OAM Obs. || AMO || align=right data-sort-value="0.43" | 430 m || 
|-id=451 bgcolor=#fefefe
| 425451 ||  || — || March 15, 2010 || Catalina || CSS || H || align=right data-sort-value="0.65" | 650 m || 
|-id=452 bgcolor=#d6d6d6
| 425452 ||  || — || March 13, 2010 || Catalina || CSS || — || align=right | 3.1 km || 
|-id=453 bgcolor=#d6d6d6
| 425453 ||  || — || March 12, 2010 || Catalina || CSS || — || align=right | 2.6 km || 
|-id=454 bgcolor=#fefefe
| 425454 ||  || — || March 12, 2010 || Mount Lemmon || Mount Lemmon Survey || H || align=right data-sort-value="0.80" | 800 m || 
|-id=455 bgcolor=#d6d6d6
| 425455 ||  || — || March 13, 2010 || Kitt Peak || Spacewatch || — || align=right | 3.4 km || 
|-id=456 bgcolor=#d6d6d6
| 425456 ||  || — || February 18, 2010 || Mount Lemmon || Mount Lemmon Survey || — || align=right | 2.0 km || 
|-id=457 bgcolor=#d6d6d6
| 425457 ||  || — || March 12, 2010 || Kitt Peak || Spacewatch || — || align=right | 2.5 km || 
|-id=458 bgcolor=#d6d6d6
| 425458 ||  || — || March 12, 2010 || Mount Lemmon || Mount Lemmon Survey || — || align=right | 3.5 km || 
|-id=459 bgcolor=#E9E9E9
| 425459 ||  || — || February 15, 2010 || Catalina || CSS || — || align=right | 2.6 km || 
|-id=460 bgcolor=#d6d6d6
| 425460 ||  || — || February 12, 2004 || Kitt Peak || Spacewatch || — || align=right | 3.0 km || 
|-id=461 bgcolor=#d6d6d6
| 425461 ||  || — || March 10, 2005 || Mount Lemmon || Mount Lemmon Survey || — || align=right | 2.9 km || 
|-id=462 bgcolor=#d6d6d6
| 425462 ||  || — || March 14, 2010 || Kitt Peak || Spacewatch || — || align=right | 2.3 km || 
|-id=463 bgcolor=#d6d6d6
| 425463 ||  || — || April 2, 2005 || Kitt Peak || Spacewatch || — || align=right | 2.6 km || 
|-id=464 bgcolor=#d6d6d6
| 425464 ||  || — || October 6, 1996 || Kitt Peak || Spacewatch || — || align=right | 2.6 km || 
|-id=465 bgcolor=#d6d6d6
| 425465 ||  || — || March 14, 2010 || Kitt Peak || Spacewatch || — || align=right | 4.2 km || 
|-id=466 bgcolor=#d6d6d6
| 425466 ||  || — || March 15, 2010 || Kitt Peak || Spacewatch || — || align=right | 4.8 km || 
|-id=467 bgcolor=#d6d6d6
| 425467 ||  || — || August 10, 2007 || Kitt Peak || Spacewatch || — || align=right | 2.3 km || 
|-id=468 bgcolor=#fefefe
| 425468 ||  || — || March 14, 2010 || Catalina || CSS || H || align=right data-sort-value="0.99" | 990 m || 
|-id=469 bgcolor=#d6d6d6
| 425469 ||  || — || March 11, 2010 || Moletai || K. Černis, J. Zdanavičius || — || align=right | 3.6 km || 
|-id=470 bgcolor=#d6d6d6
| 425470 ||  || — || March 12, 2010 || Kitt Peak || Spacewatch || — || align=right | 3.3 km || 
|-id=471 bgcolor=#d6d6d6
| 425471 ||  || — || March 14, 2010 || Kitt Peak || Spacewatch || — || align=right | 4.3 km || 
|-id=472 bgcolor=#d6d6d6
| 425472 ||  || — || March 4, 2010 || Kitt Peak || Spacewatch || — || align=right | 4.4 km || 
|-id=473 bgcolor=#d6d6d6
| 425473 ||  || — || March 12, 2010 || Kitt Peak || Spacewatch || — || align=right | 3.0 km || 
|-id=474 bgcolor=#d6d6d6
| 425474 ||  || — || March 13, 2010 || Catalina || CSS || — || align=right | 3.1 km || 
|-id=475 bgcolor=#d6d6d6
| 425475 ||  || — || March 14, 2010 || Catalina || CSS || — || align=right | 3.9 km || 
|-id=476 bgcolor=#d6d6d6
| 425476 ||  || — || March 15, 2010 || Catalina || CSS || — || align=right | 4.8 km || 
|-id=477 bgcolor=#d6d6d6
| 425477 ||  || — || March 13, 2010 || Kitt Peak || Spacewatch || — || align=right | 3.8 km || 
|-id=478 bgcolor=#d6d6d6
| 425478 ||  || — || March 13, 2010 || Mount Lemmon || Mount Lemmon Survey || — || align=right | 4.2 km || 
|-id=479 bgcolor=#d6d6d6
| 425479 ||  || — || March 16, 2010 || Mount Lemmon || Mount Lemmon Survey || URS || align=right | 4.7 km || 
|-id=480 bgcolor=#d6d6d6
| 425480 ||  || — || March 16, 2010 || Purple Mountain || PMO NEO || — || align=right | 3.5 km || 
|-id=481 bgcolor=#d6d6d6
| 425481 ||  || — || March 18, 2010 || Mount Lemmon || Mount Lemmon Survey || — || align=right | 3.2 km || 
|-id=482 bgcolor=#d6d6d6
| 425482 ||  || — || September 20, 2007 || Kitt Peak || Spacewatch || — || align=right | 2.8 km || 
|-id=483 bgcolor=#d6d6d6
| 425483 ||  || — || March 18, 2010 || Mount Lemmon || Mount Lemmon Survey || Tj (2.99) || align=right | 5.0 km || 
|-id=484 bgcolor=#d6d6d6
| 425484 ||  || — || March 11, 2005 || Kitt Peak || Spacewatch || EOS || align=right | 1.9 km || 
|-id=485 bgcolor=#d6d6d6
| 425485 ||  || — || October 15, 2009 || Mount Lemmon || Mount Lemmon Survey || — || align=right | 4.5 km || 
|-id=486 bgcolor=#d6d6d6
| 425486 ||  || — || June 10, 2005 || Kitt Peak || Spacewatch || — || align=right | 2.5 km || 
|-id=487 bgcolor=#d6d6d6
| 425487 ||  || — || March 21, 2010 || Catalina || CSS || EOS || align=right | 2.0 km || 
|-id=488 bgcolor=#d6d6d6
| 425488 ||  || — || January 8, 2010 || Mount Lemmon || Mount Lemmon Survey || — || align=right | 3.4 km || 
|-id=489 bgcolor=#d6d6d6
| 425489 ||  || — || February 18, 2010 || Mount Lemmon || Mount Lemmon Survey || — || align=right | 2.5 km || 
|-id=490 bgcolor=#d6d6d6
| 425490 ||  || — || February 12, 2004 || Kitt Peak || Spacewatch || — || align=right | 2.6 km || 
|-id=491 bgcolor=#d6d6d6
| 425491 ||  || — || January 23, 2010 || WISE || WISE || — || align=right | 4.8 km || 
|-id=492 bgcolor=#d6d6d6
| 425492 ||  || — || April 5, 2010 || Kitt Peak || Spacewatch || — || align=right | 3.7 km || 
|-id=493 bgcolor=#d6d6d6
| 425493 ||  || — || June 3, 2005 || Kitt Peak || Spacewatch || — || align=right | 2.0 km || 
|-id=494 bgcolor=#d6d6d6
| 425494 ||  || — || January 13, 2010 || WISE || WISE || — || align=right | 4.9 km || 
|-id=495 bgcolor=#d6d6d6
| 425495 ||  || — || January 12, 2010 || WISE || WISE || — || align=right | 2.8 km || 
|-id=496 bgcolor=#d6d6d6
| 425496 ||  || — || April 10, 2010 || Kitt Peak || Spacewatch || — || align=right | 3.1 km || 
|-id=497 bgcolor=#d6d6d6
| 425497 ||  || — || April 5, 2010 || Kitt Peak || Spacewatch || HYG || align=right | 3.7 km || 
|-id=498 bgcolor=#d6d6d6
| 425498 ||  || — || April 7, 2010 || Kitt Peak || Spacewatch || — || align=right | 4.2 km || 
|-id=499 bgcolor=#d6d6d6
| 425499 ||  || — || August 19, 2006 || Kitt Peak || Spacewatch || — || align=right | 2.6 km || 
|-id=500 bgcolor=#d6d6d6
| 425500 ||  || — || April 7, 2010 || Kitt Peak || Spacewatch || — || align=right | 4.3 km || 
|}

425501–425600 

|-bgcolor=#d6d6d6
| 425501 ||  || — || February 11, 2010 || WISE || WISE || — || align=right | 4.3 km || 
|-id=502 bgcolor=#d6d6d6
| 425502 ||  || — || October 2, 2008 || Mount Lemmon || Mount Lemmon Survey || — || align=right | 2.3 km || 
|-id=503 bgcolor=#d6d6d6
| 425503 ||  || — || April 7, 2010 || Catalina || CSS || — || align=right | 3.9 km || 
|-id=504 bgcolor=#d6d6d6
| 425504 ||  || — || March 20, 2010 || Catalina || CSS || — || align=right | 3.5 km || 
|-id=505 bgcolor=#d6d6d6
| 425505 ||  || — || November 21, 2008 || Kitt Peak || Spacewatch || EOS || align=right | 2.2 km || 
|-id=506 bgcolor=#fefefe
| 425506 ||  || — || April 22, 2010 || WISE || WISE || — || align=right | 1.9 km || 
|-id=507 bgcolor=#d6d6d6
| 425507 ||  || — || November 18, 2007 || Mount Lemmon || Mount Lemmon Survey || — || align=right | 2.9 km || 
|-id=508 bgcolor=#d6d6d6
| 425508 ||  || — || September 28, 2006 || Kitt Peak || Spacewatch || — || align=right | 2.7 km || 
|-id=509 bgcolor=#d6d6d6
| 425509 ||  || — || January 26, 2010 || WISE || WISE || — || align=right | 4.3 km || 
|-id=510 bgcolor=#d6d6d6
| 425510 ||  || — || May 7, 2010 || Mount Lemmon || Mount Lemmon Survey || — || align=right | 3.1 km || 
|-id=511 bgcolor=#d6d6d6
| 425511 ||  || — || May 8, 2010 || WISE || WISE || — || align=right | 3.3 km || 
|-id=512 bgcolor=#d6d6d6
| 425512 ||  || — || May 6, 2010 || Kitt Peak || Spacewatch || — || align=right | 3.4 km || 
|-id=513 bgcolor=#d6d6d6
| 425513 ||  || — || February 21, 2010 || WISE || WISE || — || align=right | 4.0 km || 
|-id=514 bgcolor=#d6d6d6
| 425514 ||  || — || September 17, 2006 || Catalina || CSS || — || align=right | 2.8 km || 
|-id=515 bgcolor=#d6d6d6
| 425515 ||  || — || October 6, 1996 || Kitt Peak || Spacewatch || EOS || align=right | 2.0 km || 
|-id=516 bgcolor=#d6d6d6
| 425516 ||  || — || November 19, 2008 || Kitt Peak || Spacewatch || EOS || align=right | 2.6 km || 
|-id=517 bgcolor=#fefefe
| 425517 ||  || — || May 23, 2010 || WISE || WISE || — || align=right | 1.3 km || 
|-id=518 bgcolor=#d6d6d6
| 425518 ||  || — || March 24, 2004 || Siding Spring || SSS || THB || align=right | 3.7 km || 
|-id=519 bgcolor=#fefefe
| 425519 ||  || — || June 2, 2010 || WISE || WISE || — || align=right | 1.7 km || 
|-id=520 bgcolor=#fefefe
| 425520 ||  || — || June 4, 2010 || Catalina || CSS || — || align=right | 1.3 km || 
|-id=521 bgcolor=#d6d6d6
| 425521 ||  || — || October 16, 2007 || Mount Lemmon || Mount Lemmon Survey || LIX || align=right | 3.7 km || 
|-id=522 bgcolor=#fefefe
| 425522 ||  || — || June 19, 2010 || WISE || WISE || — || align=right | 1.3 km || 
|-id=523 bgcolor=#fefefe
| 425523 ||  || — || June 27, 2010 || WISE || WISE || (5026) || align=right | 1.7 km || 
|-id=524 bgcolor=#fefefe
| 425524 ||  || — || October 25, 2003 || Kitt Peak || Spacewatch || — || align=right | 2.3 km || 
|-id=525 bgcolor=#d6d6d6
| 425525 ||  || — || January 30, 2009 || Mount Lemmon || Mount Lemmon Survey || 7:4 || align=right | 3.5 km || 
|-id=526 bgcolor=#fefefe
| 425526 ||  || — || July 9, 2010 || WISE || WISE || — || align=right | 1.8 km || 
|-id=527 bgcolor=#d6d6d6
| 425527 ||  || — || July 13, 2010 || WISE || WISE || — || align=right | 2.0 km || 
|-id=528 bgcolor=#FA8072
| 425528 ||  || — || May 25, 2006 || Mount Lemmon || Mount Lemmon Survey || — || align=right | 1.2 km || 
|-id=529 bgcolor=#fefefe
| 425529 ||  || — || July 21, 2010 || WISE || WISE || — || align=right | 1.2 km || 
|-id=530 bgcolor=#fefefe
| 425530 ||  || — || December 18, 2007 || Mount Lemmon || Mount Lemmon Survey || — || align=right | 1.0 km || 
|-id=531 bgcolor=#fefefe
| 425531 ||  || — || November 20, 2000 || Socorro || LINEAR || — || align=right | 1.5 km || 
|-id=532 bgcolor=#d6d6d6
| 425532 ||  || — || July 28, 2010 || WISE || WISE || — || align=right | 3.9 km || 
|-id=533 bgcolor=#fefefe
| 425533 ||  || — || September 16, 2006 || Siding Spring || SSS || — || align=right | 1.5 km || 
|-id=534 bgcolor=#d6d6d6
| 425534 ||  || — || July 29, 2010 || WISE || WISE || — || align=right | 3.0 km || 
|-id=535 bgcolor=#d6d6d6
| 425535 ||  || — || July 31, 2010 || WISE || WISE || — || align=right | 3.3 km || 
|-id=536 bgcolor=#C2FFFF
| 425536 ||  || — || August 10, 2010 || Kitt Peak || Spacewatch || L4 || align=right | 10 km || 
|-id=537 bgcolor=#FA8072
| 425537 ||  || — || December 31, 2007 || Kitt Peak || Spacewatch || — || align=right | 1.1 km || 
|-id=538 bgcolor=#fefefe
| 425538 ||  || — || December 4, 2007 || Catalina || CSS || — || align=right data-sort-value="0.71" | 710 m || 
|-id=539 bgcolor=#fefefe
| 425539 ||  || — || September 2, 2010 || Mount Lemmon || Mount Lemmon Survey || — || align=right data-sort-value="0.65" | 650 m || 
|-id=540 bgcolor=#fefefe
| 425540 ||  || — || September 1, 2010 || Mount Lemmon || Mount Lemmon Survey || (883) || align=right data-sort-value="0.77" | 770 m || 
|-id=541 bgcolor=#fefefe
| 425541 ||  || — || September 2, 2010 || Socorro || LINEAR || — || align=right data-sort-value="0.99" | 990 m || 
|-id=542 bgcolor=#fefefe
| 425542 ||  || — || March 21, 2009 || Kitt Peak || Spacewatch || — || align=right | 1.2 km || 
|-id=543 bgcolor=#fefefe
| 425543 ||  || — || September 4, 2010 || Kitt Peak || Spacewatch || — || align=right data-sort-value="0.78" | 780 m || 
|-id=544 bgcolor=#fefefe
| 425544 ||  || — || September 5, 2010 || Mount Lemmon || Mount Lemmon Survey || — || align=right data-sort-value="0.75" | 750 m || 
|-id=545 bgcolor=#fefefe
| 425545 ||  || — || September 6, 2010 || Kitt Peak || Spacewatch || — || align=right data-sort-value="0.90" | 900 m || 
|-id=546 bgcolor=#fefefe
| 425546 ||  || — || September 5, 2010 || Dauban || F. Kugel || — || align=right data-sort-value="0.95" | 950 m || 
|-id=547 bgcolor=#fefefe
| 425547 ||  || — || September 2, 2010 || Mount Lemmon || Mount Lemmon Survey || — || align=right data-sort-value="0.69" | 690 m || 
|-id=548 bgcolor=#fefefe
| 425548 ||  || — || September 10, 2010 || Kitt Peak || Spacewatch || — || align=right data-sort-value="0.75" | 750 m || 
|-id=549 bgcolor=#fefefe
| 425549 ||  || — || September 10, 2010 || Kitt Peak || Spacewatch || — || align=right data-sort-value="0.62" | 620 m || 
|-id=550 bgcolor=#fefefe
| 425550 ||  || — || December 30, 2007 || Mount Lemmon || Mount Lemmon Survey || — || align=right data-sort-value="0.56" | 560 m || 
|-id=551 bgcolor=#fefefe
| 425551 ||  || — || May 31, 2006 || Mount Lemmon || Mount Lemmon Survey || — || align=right data-sort-value="0.76" | 760 m || 
|-id=552 bgcolor=#fefefe
| 425552 ||  || — || September 11, 2010 || Kitt Peak || Spacewatch || — || align=right data-sort-value="0.63" | 630 m || 
|-id=553 bgcolor=#fefefe
| 425553 ||  || — || September 11, 2010 || Catalina || CSS || — || align=right data-sort-value="0.79" | 790 m || 
|-id=554 bgcolor=#fefefe
| 425554 ||  || — || November 13, 2007 || Mount Lemmon || Mount Lemmon Survey || — || align=right data-sort-value="0.66" | 660 m || 
|-id=555 bgcolor=#fefefe
| 425555 ||  || — || August 22, 2003 || Campo Imperatore || CINEOS || — || align=right data-sort-value="0.89" | 890 m || 
|-id=556 bgcolor=#fefefe
| 425556 ||  || — || August 5, 2010 || Kitt Peak || Spacewatch || — || align=right data-sort-value="0.68" | 680 m || 
|-id=557 bgcolor=#fefefe
| 425557 ||  || — || October 9, 2007 || Kitt Peak || Spacewatch || — || align=right data-sort-value="0.51" | 510 m || 
|-id=558 bgcolor=#fefefe
| 425558 ||  || — || October 18, 2003 || Kitt Peak || Spacewatch || NYS || align=right data-sort-value="0.49" | 490 m || 
|-id=559 bgcolor=#fefefe
| 425559 ||  || — || October 1, 2000 || Socorro || LINEAR || — || align=right data-sort-value="0.69" | 690 m || 
|-id=560 bgcolor=#fefefe
| 425560 ||  || — || December 16, 2007 || Mount Lemmon || Mount Lemmon Survey || V || align=right data-sort-value="0.56" | 560 m || 
|-id=561 bgcolor=#fefefe
| 425561 ||  || — || January 13, 2008 || Kitt Peak || Spacewatch || MAS || align=right data-sort-value="0.71" | 710 m || 
|-id=562 bgcolor=#fefefe
| 425562 ||  || — || September 15, 2010 || Kitt Peak || Spacewatch || — || align=right data-sort-value="0.65" | 650 m || 
|-id=563 bgcolor=#fefefe
| 425563 ||  || — || September 9, 2010 || Kitt Peak || Spacewatch || — || align=right data-sort-value="0.79" | 790 m || 
|-id=564 bgcolor=#fefefe
| 425564 ||  || — || February 2, 2008 || Kitt Peak || Spacewatch || NYS || align=right data-sort-value="0.64" | 640 m || 
|-id=565 bgcolor=#fefefe
| 425565 ||  || — || September 4, 2010 || Kitt Peak || Spacewatch || — || align=right data-sort-value="0.85" | 850 m || 
|-id=566 bgcolor=#fefefe
| 425566 ||  || — || October 27, 2003 || Kitt Peak || Spacewatch || — || align=right data-sort-value="0.64" | 640 m || 
|-id=567 bgcolor=#fefefe
| 425567 ||  || — || November 14, 2007 || Mount Lemmon || Mount Lemmon Survey || — || align=right data-sort-value="0.71" | 710 m || 
|-id=568 bgcolor=#fefefe
| 425568 ||  || — || December 17, 2007 || Mount Lemmon || Mount Lemmon Survey || — || align=right data-sort-value="0.65" | 650 m || 
|-id=569 bgcolor=#fefefe
| 425569 ||  || — || September 9, 2010 || Kitt Peak || Spacewatch || — || align=right data-sort-value="0.74" | 740 m || 
|-id=570 bgcolor=#fefefe
| 425570 ||  || — || November 19, 2003 || Kitt Peak || Spacewatch || — || align=right data-sort-value="0.79" | 790 m || 
|-id=571 bgcolor=#fefefe
| 425571 ||  || — || October 3, 1999 || Kitt Peak || Spacewatch || — || align=right data-sort-value="0.79" | 790 m || 
|-id=572 bgcolor=#fefefe
| 425572 ||  || — || April 29, 2006 || Kitt Peak || Spacewatch || — || align=right data-sort-value="0.85" | 850 m || 
|-id=573 bgcolor=#fefefe
| 425573 ||  || — || September 16, 2010 || Kitt Peak || Spacewatch || — || align=right data-sort-value="0.72" | 720 m || 
|-id=574 bgcolor=#fefefe
| 425574 ||  || — || January 16, 2004 || Kitt Peak || Spacewatch || NYS || align=right data-sort-value="0.49" | 490 m || 
|-id=575 bgcolor=#fefefe
| 425575 ||  || — || September 17, 2010 || Kitt Peak || Spacewatch || — || align=right data-sort-value="0.54" | 540 m || 
|-id=576 bgcolor=#fefefe
| 425576 ||  || — || October 18, 1999 || Kitt Peak || Spacewatch || — || align=right data-sort-value="0.80" | 800 m || 
|-id=577 bgcolor=#fefefe
| 425577 ||  || — || November 9, 1996 || Kitt Peak || Spacewatch || — || align=right data-sort-value="0.57" | 570 m || 
|-id=578 bgcolor=#fefefe
| 425578 ||  || — || September 21, 2003 || Kitt Peak || Spacewatch || — || align=right data-sort-value="0.74" | 740 m || 
|-id=579 bgcolor=#fefefe
| 425579 ||  || — || September 18, 2010 || Mount Lemmon || Mount Lemmon Survey || — || align=right data-sort-value="0.91" | 910 m || 
|-id=580 bgcolor=#fefefe
| 425580 ||  || — || September 16, 2010 || Kitt Peak || Spacewatch || — || align=right data-sort-value="0.71" | 710 m || 
|-id=581 bgcolor=#fefefe
| 425581 ||  || — || November 19, 2003 || Kitt Peak || Spacewatch || — || align=right data-sort-value="0.48" | 480 m || 
|-id=582 bgcolor=#fefefe
| 425582 ||  || — || September 4, 2010 || Kitt Peak || Spacewatch || — || align=right data-sort-value="0.63" | 630 m || 
|-id=583 bgcolor=#fefefe
| 425583 ||  || — || February 12, 2008 || Kitt Peak || Spacewatch || MAS || align=right data-sort-value="0.56" | 560 m || 
|-id=584 bgcolor=#fefefe
| 425584 ||  || — || September 17, 2010 || Mount Lemmon || Mount Lemmon Survey || — || align=right data-sort-value="0.54" | 540 m || 
|-id=585 bgcolor=#fefefe
| 425585 ||  || — || January 1, 2008 || Kitt Peak || Spacewatch || — || align=right data-sort-value="0.54" | 540 m || 
|-id=586 bgcolor=#fefefe
| 425586 ||  || — || September 18, 2006 || Kitt Peak || Spacewatch || V || align=right data-sort-value="0.73" | 730 m || 
|-id=587 bgcolor=#fefefe
| 425587 ||  || — || August 10, 2010 || Kitt Peak || Spacewatch || — || align=right data-sort-value="0.68" | 680 m || 
|-id=588 bgcolor=#fefefe
| 425588 ||  || — || October 11, 2010 || Mount Lemmon || Mount Lemmon Survey || — || align=right data-sort-value="0.58" | 580 m || 
|-id=589 bgcolor=#fefefe
| 425589 ||  || — || September 18, 1995 || Kitt Peak || Spacewatch || NYS || align=right data-sort-value="0.63" | 630 m || 
|-id=590 bgcolor=#fefefe
| 425590 ||  || — || October 23, 2003 || Kitt Peak || Spacewatch || — || align=right data-sort-value="0.54" | 540 m || 
|-id=591 bgcolor=#fefefe
| 425591 ||  || — || October 11, 2010 || Mount Lemmon || Mount Lemmon Survey || — || align=right data-sort-value="0.75" | 750 m || 
|-id=592 bgcolor=#fefefe
| 425592 ||  || — || September 17, 2003 || Kitt Peak || Spacewatch || — || align=right data-sort-value="0.62" | 620 m || 
|-id=593 bgcolor=#fefefe
| 425593 ||  || — || October 21, 2003 || Kitt Peak || Spacewatch || V || align=right data-sort-value="0.54" | 540 m || 
|-id=594 bgcolor=#fefefe
| 425594 ||  || — || October 22, 2003 || Socorro || LINEAR || — || align=right data-sort-value="0.99" | 990 m || 
|-id=595 bgcolor=#fefefe
| 425595 ||  || — || March 2, 2009 || Mount Lemmon || Mount Lemmon Survey || — || align=right data-sort-value="0.74" | 740 m || 
|-id=596 bgcolor=#fefefe
| 425596 ||  || — || October 21, 2003 || Kitt Peak || Spacewatch || NYS || align=right data-sort-value="0.63" | 630 m || 
|-id=597 bgcolor=#fefefe
| 425597 ||  || — || October 16, 2003 || Kitt Peak || Spacewatch || — || align=right data-sort-value="0.77" | 770 m || 
|-id=598 bgcolor=#fefefe
| 425598 ||  || — || November 1, 1999 || Kitt Peak || Spacewatch || MAS || align=right data-sort-value="0.61" | 610 m || 
|-id=599 bgcolor=#fefefe
| 425599 ||  || — || May 7, 2005 || Mount Lemmon || Mount Lemmon Survey || — || align=right data-sort-value="0.89" | 890 m || 
|-id=600 bgcolor=#fefefe
| 425600 ||  || — || September 18, 2010 || Mount Lemmon || Mount Lemmon Survey || NYS || align=right data-sort-value="0.64" | 640 m || 
|}

425601–425700 

|-bgcolor=#E9E9E9
| 425601 ||  || — || October 28, 2010 || Kitt Peak || Spacewatch || MAR || align=right | 1.4 km || 
|-id=602 bgcolor=#fefefe
| 425602 ||  || — || October 25, 2003 || Kitt Peak || Spacewatch || — || align=right data-sort-value="0.65" | 650 m || 
|-id=603 bgcolor=#fefefe
| 425603 ||  || — || December 30, 2007 || Kitt Peak || Spacewatch || — || align=right data-sort-value="0.68" | 680 m || 
|-id=604 bgcolor=#fefefe
| 425604 ||  || — || September 24, 2000 || Socorro || LINEAR || — || align=right data-sort-value="0.81" | 810 m || 
|-id=605 bgcolor=#fefefe
| 425605 ||  || — || November 24, 2003 || Anderson Mesa || LONEOS || — || align=right data-sort-value="0.67" | 670 m || 
|-id=606 bgcolor=#fefefe
| 425606 ||  || — || October 17, 1995 || Kitt Peak || Spacewatch || (5026) || align=right | 1.6 km || 
|-id=607 bgcolor=#fefefe
| 425607 ||  || — || December 18, 2003 || Socorro || LINEAR || — || align=right data-sort-value="0.79" | 790 m || 
|-id=608 bgcolor=#fefefe
| 425608 ||  || — || October 9, 2010 || Catalina || CSS || — || align=right | 1.0 km || 
|-id=609 bgcolor=#fefefe
| 425609 ||  || — || October 4, 2006 || Mount Lemmon || Mount Lemmon Survey || — || align=right data-sort-value="0.92" | 920 m || 
|-id=610 bgcolor=#fefefe
| 425610 ||  || — || November 20, 2007 || Catalina || CSS || — || align=right | 1.5 km || 
|-id=611 bgcolor=#fefefe
| 425611 ||  || — || November 12, 1999 || Socorro || LINEAR || NYS || align=right data-sort-value="0.59" | 590 m || 
|-id=612 bgcolor=#fefefe
| 425612 ||  || — || September 19, 2006 || Catalina || CSS || — || align=right data-sort-value="0.74" | 740 m || 
|-id=613 bgcolor=#fefefe
| 425613 ||  || — || November 27, 1995 || Kitt Peak || Spacewatch || — || align=right data-sort-value="0.78" | 780 m || 
|-id=614 bgcolor=#fefefe
| 425614 ||  || — || January 11, 2008 || Catalina || CSS || — || align=right data-sort-value="0.88" | 880 m || 
|-id=615 bgcolor=#fefefe
| 425615 ||  || — || December 18, 2003 || Socorro || LINEAR || NYS || align=right data-sort-value="0.64" | 640 m || 
|-id=616 bgcolor=#fefefe
| 425616 ||  || — || October 14, 2010 || Mount Lemmon || Mount Lemmon Survey || NYS || align=right data-sort-value="0.59" | 590 m || 
|-id=617 bgcolor=#fefefe
| 425617 ||  || — || September 11, 2010 || Mount Lemmon || Mount Lemmon Survey || MAS || align=right data-sort-value="0.76" | 760 m || 
|-id=618 bgcolor=#fefefe
| 425618 ||  || — || December 19, 2003 || Socorro || LINEAR || — || align=right data-sort-value="0.77" | 770 m || 
|-id=619 bgcolor=#fefefe
| 425619 ||  || — || September 20, 2003 || Kitt Peak || Spacewatch || — || align=right data-sort-value="0.68" | 680 m || 
|-id=620 bgcolor=#fefefe
| 425620 ||  || — || March 6, 2008 || Mount Lemmon || Mount Lemmon Survey || — || align=right data-sort-value="0.90" | 900 m || 
|-id=621 bgcolor=#fefefe
| 425621 ||  || — || October 30, 2010 || Kitt Peak || Spacewatch || — || align=right data-sort-value="0.61" | 610 m || 
|-id=622 bgcolor=#fefefe
| 425622 ||  || — || January 16, 2004 || Kitt Peak || Spacewatch || — || align=right data-sort-value="0.77" | 770 m || 
|-id=623 bgcolor=#fefefe
| 425623 ||  || — || April 19, 2009 || Mount Lemmon || Mount Lemmon Survey || — || align=right | 1.1 km || 
|-id=624 bgcolor=#fefefe
| 425624 ||  || — || September 11, 2010 || Mount Lemmon || Mount Lemmon Survey || — || align=right data-sort-value="0.69" | 690 m || 
|-id=625 bgcolor=#fefefe
| 425625 ||  || — || October 10, 1999 || Kitt Peak || Spacewatch || MAS || align=right data-sort-value="0.56" | 560 m || 
|-id=626 bgcolor=#fefefe
| 425626 ||  || — || August 18, 2006 || Kitt Peak || Spacewatch || MAS || align=right data-sort-value="0.58" | 580 m || 
|-id=627 bgcolor=#fefefe
| 425627 ||  || — || November 17, 1999 || Kitt Peak || Spacewatch || NYS || align=right data-sort-value="0.50" | 500 m || 
|-id=628 bgcolor=#fefefe
| 425628 ||  || — || November 5, 2010 || Kitt Peak || Spacewatch || — || align=right data-sort-value="0.82" | 820 m || 
|-id=629 bgcolor=#fefefe
| 425629 ||  || — || September 5, 2010 || Mount Lemmon || Mount Lemmon Survey || — || align=right data-sort-value="0.69" | 690 m || 
|-id=630 bgcolor=#fefefe
| 425630 ||  || — || September 17, 2006 || Kitt Peak || Spacewatch || NYS || align=right data-sort-value="0.53" | 530 m || 
|-id=631 bgcolor=#fefefe
| 425631 ||  || — || October 29, 2010 || Mount Lemmon || Mount Lemmon Survey || — || align=right data-sort-value="0.77" | 770 m || 
|-id=632 bgcolor=#fefefe
| 425632 ||  || — || October 18, 2006 || Kitt Peak || Spacewatch || — || align=right data-sort-value="0.70" | 700 m || 
|-id=633 bgcolor=#fefefe
| 425633 ||  || — || January 11, 2008 || Mount Lemmon || Mount Lemmon Survey || — || align=right data-sort-value="0.87" | 870 m || 
|-id=634 bgcolor=#E9E9E9
| 425634 ||  || — || December 13, 2006 || Kitt Peak || Spacewatch || — || align=right | 1.3 km || 
|-id=635 bgcolor=#fefefe
| 425635 ||  || — || February 27, 2008 || Mount Lemmon || Mount Lemmon Survey || NYS || align=right data-sort-value="0.63" | 630 m || 
|-id=636 bgcolor=#fefefe
| 425636 ||  || — || October 13, 2010 || Catalina || CSS || — || align=right data-sort-value="0.85" | 850 m || 
|-id=637 bgcolor=#fefefe
| 425637 ||  || — || August 29, 2006 || Kitt Peak || Spacewatch || V || align=right data-sort-value="0.65" | 650 m || 
|-id=638 bgcolor=#fefefe
| 425638 ||  || — || February 8, 2008 || Mount Lemmon || Mount Lemmon Survey || — || align=right data-sort-value="0.72" | 720 m || 
|-id=639 bgcolor=#fefefe
| 425639 ||  || — || April 11, 2005 || Kitt Peak || Spacewatch || V || align=right data-sort-value="0.72" | 720 m || 
|-id=640 bgcolor=#E9E9E9
| 425640 ||  || — || November 19, 2006 || Kitt Peak || Spacewatch || — || align=right | 1.6 km || 
|-id=641 bgcolor=#fefefe
| 425641 ||  || — || November 11, 2010 || Kitt Peak || Spacewatch || — || align=right data-sort-value="0.80" | 800 m || 
|-id=642 bgcolor=#fefefe
| 425642 ||  || — || September 5, 1999 || Kitt Peak || Spacewatch || — || align=right data-sort-value="0.62" | 620 m || 
|-id=643 bgcolor=#fefefe
| 425643 ||  || — || December 19, 2003 || Kitt Peak || Spacewatch || — || align=right data-sort-value="0.93" | 930 m || 
|-id=644 bgcolor=#fefefe
| 425644 ||  || — || December 1, 2003 || Kitt Peak || Spacewatch || (2076) || align=right data-sort-value="0.60" | 600 m || 
|-id=645 bgcolor=#fefefe
| 425645 ||  || — || September 20, 2006 || Kitt Peak || Spacewatch || — || align=right data-sort-value="0.69" | 690 m || 
|-id=646 bgcolor=#fefefe
| 425646 ||  || — || October 30, 2010 || Mount Lemmon || Mount Lemmon Survey || — || align=right data-sort-value="0.68" | 680 m || 
|-id=647 bgcolor=#fefefe
| 425647 ||  || — || August 28, 2006 || Anderson Mesa || LONEOS || — || align=right data-sort-value="0.96" | 960 m || 
|-id=648 bgcolor=#fefefe
| 425648 ||  || — || October 11, 2010 || Mount Lemmon || Mount Lemmon Survey || V || align=right data-sort-value="0.58" | 580 m || 
|-id=649 bgcolor=#fefefe
| 425649 ||  || — || October 13, 2010 || Mount Lemmon || Mount Lemmon Survey || — || align=right data-sort-value="0.75" | 750 m || 
|-id=650 bgcolor=#fefefe
| 425650 ||  || — || October 18, 2003 || Kitt Peak || Spacewatch || — || align=right data-sort-value="0.77" | 770 m || 
|-id=651 bgcolor=#fefefe
| 425651 ||  || — || December 31, 2007 || Kitt Peak || Spacewatch || — || align=right data-sort-value="0.66" | 660 m || 
|-id=652 bgcolor=#E9E9E9
| 425652 ||  || — || November 12, 2010 || Mount Lemmon || Mount Lemmon Survey || KON || align=right | 2.1 km || 
|-id=653 bgcolor=#fefefe
| 425653 ||  || — || February 14, 2004 || Kitt Peak || Spacewatch || — || align=right data-sort-value="0.64" | 640 m || 
|-id=654 bgcolor=#fefefe
| 425654 ||  || — || November 13, 2006 || Catalina || CSS || — || align=right data-sort-value="0.94" | 940 m || 
|-id=655 bgcolor=#fefefe
| 425655 ||  || — || November 16, 1999 || Kitt Peak || Spacewatch || NYS || align=right data-sort-value="0.58" | 580 m || 
|-id=656 bgcolor=#fefefe
| 425656 ||  || — || September 27, 2006 || Kitt Peak || Spacewatch || V || align=right data-sort-value="0.56" | 560 m || 
|-id=657 bgcolor=#E9E9E9
| 425657 ||  || — || November 9, 2009 || Kitt Peak || Spacewatch || MAR || align=right | 1.3 km || 
|-id=658 bgcolor=#E9E9E9
| 425658 ||  || — || November 18, 2006 || Kitt Peak || Spacewatch || — || align=right | 1.2 km || 
|-id=659 bgcolor=#E9E9E9
| 425659 ||  || — || November 10, 2010 || Mount Lemmon || Mount Lemmon Survey || — || align=right | 2.1 km || 
|-id=660 bgcolor=#fefefe
| 425660 ||  || — || November 15, 2010 || Mount Lemmon || Mount Lemmon Survey || — || align=right data-sort-value="0.87" | 870 m || 
|-id=661 bgcolor=#E9E9E9
| 425661 ||  || — || December 2, 2010 || Kitt Peak || Spacewatch || — || align=right | 2.0 km || 
|-id=662 bgcolor=#fefefe
| 425662 ||  || — || October 25, 2003 || Kitt Peak || Spacewatch || — || align=right data-sort-value="0.89" | 890 m || 
|-id=663 bgcolor=#E9E9E9
| 425663 ||  || — || December 4, 2010 || Mount Lemmon || Mount Lemmon Survey || — || align=right data-sort-value="0.87" | 870 m || 
|-id=664 bgcolor=#fefefe
| 425664 ||  || — || November 17, 2006 || Kitt Peak || Spacewatch || — || align=right data-sort-value="0.77" | 770 m || 
|-id=665 bgcolor=#FA8072
| 425665 ||  || — || October 22, 2003 || Kitt Peak || Spacewatch || — || align=right data-sort-value="0.73" | 730 m || 
|-id=666 bgcolor=#fefefe
| 425666 ||  || — || November 14, 2010 || Kitt Peak || Spacewatch || V || align=right data-sort-value="0.68" | 680 m || 
|-id=667 bgcolor=#E9E9E9
| 425667 ||  || — || October 23, 2006 || Mount Lemmon || Mount Lemmon Survey || — || align=right | 1.0 km || 
|-id=668 bgcolor=#fefefe
| 425668 ||  || — || October 17, 2006 || Kitt Peak || Spacewatch || — || align=right data-sort-value="0.68" | 680 m || 
|-id=669 bgcolor=#fefefe
| 425669 ||  || — || July 21, 2006 || Mount Lemmon || Mount Lemmon Survey || NYS || align=right data-sort-value="0.63" | 630 m || 
|-id=670 bgcolor=#fefefe
| 425670 ||  || — || April 5, 2008 || Mount Lemmon || Mount Lemmon Survey || — || align=right data-sort-value="0.67" | 670 m || 
|-id=671 bgcolor=#E9E9E9
| 425671 ||  || — || November 7, 2010 || Catalina || CSS || — || align=right | 3.9 km || 
|-id=672 bgcolor=#fefefe
| 425672 ||  || — || September 26, 2006 || Catalina || CSS || — || align=right data-sort-value="0.75" | 750 m || 
|-id=673 bgcolor=#fefefe
| 425673 ||  || — || December 5, 2007 || Kitt Peak || Spacewatch || — || align=right | 1.2 km || 
|-id=674 bgcolor=#fefefe
| 425674 ||  || — || January 29, 2004 || Socorro || LINEAR || — || align=right | 1.6 km || 
|-id=675 bgcolor=#fefefe
| 425675 ||  || — || October 16, 2009 || Mount Lemmon || Mount Lemmon Survey || — || align=right data-sort-value="0.89" | 890 m || 
|-id=676 bgcolor=#fefefe
| 425676 ||  || — || April 28, 2004 || Kitt Peak || Spacewatch || — || align=right data-sort-value="0.77" | 770 m || 
|-id=677 bgcolor=#E9E9E9
| 425677 ||  || — || December 8, 2010 || Mount Lemmon || Mount Lemmon Survey || — || align=right | 1.7 km || 
|-id=678 bgcolor=#fefefe
| 425678 ||  || — || December 25, 2010 || Mount Lemmon || Mount Lemmon Survey || — || align=right data-sort-value="0.80" | 800 m || 
|-id=679 bgcolor=#E9E9E9
| 425679 ||  || — || January 28, 2007 || Kitt Peak || Spacewatch || — || align=right data-sort-value="0.88" | 880 m || 
|-id=680 bgcolor=#E9E9E9
| 425680 ||  || — || December 4, 2005 || Kitt Peak || Spacewatch || — || align=right | 2.4 km || 
|-id=681 bgcolor=#fefefe
| 425681 ||  || — || January 5, 2000 || Kitt Peak || Spacewatch || — || align=right | 1.1 km || 
|-id=682 bgcolor=#fefefe
| 425682 ||  || — || April 9, 2004 || Siding Spring || SSS || MAS || align=right data-sort-value="0.86" | 860 m || 
|-id=683 bgcolor=#E9E9E9
| 425683 ||  || — || March 14, 2007 || Mount Lemmon || Mount Lemmon Survey || — || align=right | 1.5 km || 
|-id=684 bgcolor=#fefefe
| 425684 ||  || — || December 15, 2006 || Kitt Peak || Spacewatch || V || align=right data-sort-value="0.73" | 730 m || 
|-id=685 bgcolor=#fefefe
| 425685 ||  || — || December 14, 2006 || Mount Lemmon || Mount Lemmon Survey || — || align=right | 1.6 km || 
|-id=686 bgcolor=#fefefe
| 425686 ||  || — || May 7, 2008 || Mount Lemmon || Mount Lemmon Survey || — || align=right data-sort-value="0.87" | 870 m || 
|-id=687 bgcolor=#fefefe
| 425687 ||  || — || November 22, 2006 || Mount Lemmon || Mount Lemmon Survey || — || align=right data-sort-value="0.87" | 870 m || 
|-id=688 bgcolor=#fefefe
| 425688 ||  || — || December 9, 2010 || Mount Lemmon || Mount Lemmon Survey || — || align=right data-sort-value="0.72" | 720 m || 
|-id=689 bgcolor=#E9E9E9
| 425689 ||  || — || September 17, 2009 || Catalina || CSS || — || align=right | 1.5 km || 
|-id=690 bgcolor=#fefefe
| 425690 ||  || — || December 13, 2006 || Mount Lemmon || Mount Lemmon Survey || — || align=right data-sort-value="0.71" | 710 m || 
|-id=691 bgcolor=#E9E9E9
| 425691 ||  || — || January 12, 2011 || Mount Lemmon || Mount Lemmon Survey || — || align=right | 2.0 km || 
|-id=692 bgcolor=#E9E9E9
| 425692 ||  || — || May 29, 2008 || Mount Lemmon || Mount Lemmon Survey || — || align=right | 1.5 km || 
|-id=693 bgcolor=#fefefe
| 425693 ||  || — || January 17, 2007 || Kitt Peak || Spacewatch || — || align=right data-sort-value="0.81" | 810 m || 
|-id=694 bgcolor=#fefefe
| 425694 ||  || — || December 14, 2010 || Mount Lemmon || Mount Lemmon Survey || — || align=right data-sort-value="0.93" | 930 m || 
|-id=695 bgcolor=#E9E9E9
| 425695 ||  || — || December 3, 2010 || Catalina || CSS || — || align=right | 1.3 km || 
|-id=696 bgcolor=#E9E9E9
| 425696 ||  || — || November 24, 2006 || Mount Lemmon || Mount Lemmon Survey || — || align=right | 2.7 km || 
|-id=697 bgcolor=#d6d6d6
| 425697 ||  || — || December 6, 2010 || Mount Lemmon || Mount Lemmon Survey || — || align=right | 3.5 km || 
|-id=698 bgcolor=#fefefe
| 425698 ||  || — || January 11, 2011 || Catalina || CSS || — || align=right data-sort-value="0.90" | 900 m || 
|-id=699 bgcolor=#fefefe
| 425699 ||  || — || January 11, 2011 || Kitt Peak || Spacewatch || — || align=right data-sort-value="0.90" | 900 m || 
|-id=700 bgcolor=#E9E9E9
| 425700 ||  || — || March 9, 2007 || Catalina || CSS || JUN || align=right | 1.1 km || 
|}

425701–425800 

|-bgcolor=#E9E9E9
| 425701 ||  || — || January 24, 2007 || Mount Lemmon || Mount Lemmon Survey || — || align=right data-sort-value="0.87" | 870 m || 
|-id=702 bgcolor=#E9E9E9
| 425702 ||  || — || December 5, 2010 || Mount Lemmon || Mount Lemmon Survey || — || align=right | 1.9 km || 
|-id=703 bgcolor=#fefefe
| 425703 ||  || — || May 3, 2008 || Kitt Peak || Spacewatch || — || align=right data-sort-value="0.98" | 980 m || 
|-id=704 bgcolor=#E9E9E9
| 425704 ||  || — || January 16, 2011 || Mount Lemmon || Mount Lemmon Survey || — || align=right | 2.0 km || 
|-id=705 bgcolor=#fefefe
| 425705 ||  || — || November 5, 2010 || Mount Lemmon || Mount Lemmon Survey || MAS || align=right data-sort-value="0.86" | 860 m || 
|-id=706 bgcolor=#E9E9E9
| 425706 ||  || — || March 14, 2007 || Catalina || CSS || — || align=right | 1.1 km || 
|-id=707 bgcolor=#fefefe
| 425707 ||  || — || December 13, 2006 || Mount Lemmon || Mount Lemmon Survey || — || align=right data-sort-value="0.78" | 780 m || 
|-id=708 bgcolor=#E9E9E9
| 425708 ||  || — || December 8, 2010 || Mount Lemmon || Mount Lemmon Survey || MAR || align=right | 1.5 km || 
|-id=709 bgcolor=#E9E9E9
| 425709 ||  || — || March 14, 2007 || Anderson Mesa || LONEOS || RAF || align=right | 1.2 km || 
|-id=710 bgcolor=#E9E9E9
| 425710 ||  || — || January 23, 2011 || Mount Lemmon || Mount Lemmon Survey || — || align=right data-sort-value="0.77" | 770 m || 
|-id=711 bgcolor=#FA8072
| 425711 ||  || — || February 19, 2007 || Siding Spring || SSS || — || align=right | 2.1 km || 
|-id=712 bgcolor=#E9E9E9
| 425712 ||  || — || January 26, 1998 || Kitt Peak || Spacewatch || — || align=right | 1.6 km || 
|-id=713 bgcolor=#FFC2E0
| 425713 ||  || — || January 28, 2011 || Catalina || CSS || AMO || align=right data-sort-value="0.43" | 430 m || 
|-id=714 bgcolor=#fefefe
| 425714 ||  || — || January 25, 2011 || Kitt Peak || Spacewatch || NYS || align=right data-sort-value="0.73" | 730 m || 
|-id=715 bgcolor=#E9E9E9
| 425715 ||  || — || October 14, 2001 || Socorro || LINEAR || — || align=right | 1.1 km || 
|-id=716 bgcolor=#E9E9E9
| 425716 ||  || — || July 30, 2009 || Catalina || CSS || — || align=right | 1.9 km || 
|-id=717 bgcolor=#E9E9E9
| 425717 ||  || — || November 16, 2010 || Mount Lemmon || Mount Lemmon Survey || GEF || align=right | 1.2 km || 
|-id=718 bgcolor=#E9E9E9
| 425718 ||  || — || February 10, 2002 || Socorro || LINEAR || — || align=right | 2.6 km || 
|-id=719 bgcolor=#fefefe
| 425719 ||  || — || May 4, 2008 || Kitt Peak || Spacewatch || — || align=right data-sort-value="0.82" | 820 m || 
|-id=720 bgcolor=#E9E9E9
| 425720 ||  || — || August 28, 2009 || Kitt Peak || Spacewatch || — || align=right | 1.1 km || 
|-id=721 bgcolor=#E9E9E9
| 425721 ||  || — || January 27, 2007 || Kitt Peak || Spacewatch || — || align=right data-sort-value="0.81" | 810 m || 
|-id=722 bgcolor=#E9E9E9
| 425722 ||  || — || January 28, 2011 || Mount Lemmon || Mount Lemmon Survey || — || align=right | 2.8 km || 
|-id=723 bgcolor=#E9E9E9
| 425723 ||  || — || July 28, 2008 || Mount Lemmon || Mount Lemmon Survey || EUN || align=right | 1.4 km || 
|-id=724 bgcolor=#E9E9E9
| 425724 ||  || — || January 26, 2010 || WISE || WISE || — || align=right | 2.0 km || 
|-id=725 bgcolor=#E9E9E9
| 425725 ||  || — || December 1, 2006 || Mount Lemmon || Mount Lemmon Survey || — || align=right | 1.3 km || 
|-id=726 bgcolor=#E9E9E9
| 425726 ||  || — || September 21, 2009 || Catalina || CSS || — || align=right | 1.6 km || 
|-id=727 bgcolor=#E9E9E9
| 425727 ||  || — || July 30, 2008 || Mount Lemmon || Mount Lemmon Survey || — || align=right | 1.6 km || 
|-id=728 bgcolor=#E9E9E9
| 425728 ||  || — || September 16, 2004 || Kitt Peak || Spacewatch || (5) || align=right data-sort-value="0.81" | 810 m || 
|-id=729 bgcolor=#fefefe
| 425729 ||  || — || March 15, 2004 || Socorro || LINEAR || — || align=right data-sort-value="0.82" | 820 m || 
|-id=730 bgcolor=#E9E9E9
| 425730 ||  || — || December 23, 2006 || Mount Lemmon || Mount Lemmon Survey || — || align=right data-sort-value="0.71" | 710 m || 
|-id=731 bgcolor=#E9E9E9
| 425731 ||  || — || March 14, 2007 || Catalina || CSS || — || align=right | 2.3 km || 
|-id=732 bgcolor=#E9E9E9
| 425732 ||  || — || January 28, 2011 || Mount Lemmon || Mount Lemmon Survey || — || align=right | 1.0 km || 
|-id=733 bgcolor=#E9E9E9
| 425733 ||  || — || October 1, 2005 || Mount Lemmon || Mount Lemmon Survey || — || align=right | 1.2 km || 
|-id=734 bgcolor=#fefefe
| 425734 ||  || — || June 11, 2004 || Kitt Peak || Spacewatch || — || align=right | 1.0 km || 
|-id=735 bgcolor=#fefefe
| 425735 ||  || — || March 3, 2000 || Socorro || LINEAR || — || align=right data-sort-value="0.93" | 930 m || 
|-id=736 bgcolor=#E9E9E9
| 425736 ||  || — || July 11, 2004 || Socorro || LINEAR || — || align=right | 1.4 km || 
|-id=737 bgcolor=#fefefe
| 425737 ||  || — || April 19, 2004 || Socorro || LINEAR || — || align=right | 1.1 km || 
|-id=738 bgcolor=#E9E9E9
| 425738 ||  || — || October 9, 2005 || Kitt Peak || Spacewatch || — || align=right data-sort-value="0.88" | 880 m || 
|-id=739 bgcolor=#fefefe
| 425739 ||  || — || January 10, 2011 || Mount Lemmon || Mount Lemmon Survey || — || align=right data-sort-value="0.87" | 870 m || 
|-id=740 bgcolor=#d6d6d6
| 425740 ||  || — || December 30, 2005 || Mount Lemmon || Mount Lemmon Survey || — || align=right | 2.8 km || 
|-id=741 bgcolor=#E9E9E9
| 425741 ||  || — || October 30, 2005 || Kitt Peak || Spacewatch || — || align=right data-sort-value="0.96" | 960 m || 
|-id=742 bgcolor=#E9E9E9
| 425742 ||  || — || February 17, 2007 || Kitt Peak || Spacewatch || — || align=right data-sort-value="0.75" | 750 m || 
|-id=743 bgcolor=#fefefe
| 425743 ||  || — || January 11, 2011 || Kitt Peak || Spacewatch || MAS || align=right data-sort-value="0.72" | 720 m || 
|-id=744 bgcolor=#E9E9E9
| 425744 ||  || — || March 26, 2003 || Kitt Peak || Spacewatch || — || align=right | 1.6 km || 
|-id=745 bgcolor=#E9E9E9
| 425745 ||  || — || December 21, 2006 || Mount Lemmon || Mount Lemmon Survey || — || align=right data-sort-value="0.74" | 740 m || 
|-id=746 bgcolor=#E9E9E9
| 425746 ||  || — || November 22, 2005 || Kitt Peak || Spacewatch || MRX || align=right data-sort-value="0.92" | 920 m || 
|-id=747 bgcolor=#E9E9E9
| 425747 ||  || — || January 28, 2007 || Mount Lemmon || Mount Lemmon Survey || — || align=right data-sort-value="0.67" | 670 m || 
|-id=748 bgcolor=#E9E9E9
| 425748 ||  || — || October 25, 2009 || Kitt Peak || Spacewatch || — || align=right | 1.1 km || 
|-id=749 bgcolor=#fefefe
| 425749 ||  || — || November 15, 2010 || Mount Lemmon || Mount Lemmon Survey || — || align=right data-sort-value="0.73" | 730 m || 
|-id=750 bgcolor=#E9E9E9
| 425750 ||  || — || September 13, 2005 || Kitt Peak || Spacewatch || — || align=right data-sort-value="0.94" | 940 m || 
|-id=751 bgcolor=#d6d6d6
| 425751 ||  || — || October 6, 2004 || Kitt Peak || Spacewatch || KOR || align=right | 1.2 km || 
|-id=752 bgcolor=#fefefe
| 425752 ||  || — || November 18, 1998 || Kitt Peak || Spacewatch || NYS || align=right data-sort-value="0.65" | 650 m || 
|-id=753 bgcolor=#E9E9E9
| 425753 ||  || — || December 1, 1996 || Kitt Peak || Spacewatch || — || align=right | 2.3 km || 
|-id=754 bgcolor=#E9E9E9
| 425754 ||  || — || March 13, 2007 || Catalina || CSS || — || align=right | 2.0 km || 
|-id=755 bgcolor=#FFC2E0
| 425755 ||  || — || February 2, 2011 || Haleakala || Pan-STARRS || ATEPHA || align=right data-sort-value="0.20" | 200 m || 
|-id=756 bgcolor=#fefefe
| 425756 ||  || — || November 22, 2006 || Kitt Peak || Spacewatch || NYS || align=right data-sort-value="0.71" | 710 m || 
|-id=757 bgcolor=#E9E9E9
| 425757 ||  || — || November 25, 2006 || Mount Lemmon || Mount Lemmon Survey || — || align=right data-sort-value="0.83" | 830 m || 
|-id=758 bgcolor=#E9E9E9
| 425758 ||  || — || December 19, 2001 || Kitt Peak || Spacewatch || — || align=right | 1.8 km || 
|-id=759 bgcolor=#E9E9E9
| 425759 ||  || — || September 14, 2005 || Kitt Peak || Spacewatch || — || align=right data-sort-value="0.69" | 690 m || 
|-id=760 bgcolor=#fefefe
| 425760 ||  || — || December 13, 2006 || Kitt Peak || Spacewatch || NYS || align=right data-sort-value="0.68" | 680 m || 
|-id=761 bgcolor=#E9E9E9
| 425761 ||  || — || March 16, 2007 || Kitt Peak || Spacewatch || — || align=right | 1.5 km || 
|-id=762 bgcolor=#E9E9E9
| 425762 ||  || — || March 19, 2007 || Anderson Mesa || LONEOS || — || align=right | 2.1 km || 
|-id=763 bgcolor=#fefefe
| 425763 ||  || — || December 9, 2010 || Mount Lemmon || Mount Lemmon Survey || — || align=right data-sort-value="0.74" | 740 m || 
|-id=764 bgcolor=#E9E9E9
| 425764 ||  || — || February 6, 2007 || Kitt Peak || Spacewatch || — || align=right data-sort-value="0.76" | 760 m || 
|-id=765 bgcolor=#E9E9E9
| 425765 ||  || — || January 10, 2007 || Mount Lemmon || Mount Lemmon Survey || — || align=right data-sort-value="0.96" | 960 m || 
|-id=766 bgcolor=#E9E9E9
| 425766 ||  || — || January 28, 2011 || Catalina || CSS || — || align=right | 1.3 km || 
|-id=767 bgcolor=#fefefe
| 425767 ||  || — || January 30, 2000 || Kitt Peak || Spacewatch || — || align=right data-sort-value="0.76" | 760 m || 
|-id=768 bgcolor=#E9E9E9
| 425768 ||  || — || September 28, 2009 || Kitt Peak || Spacewatch || — || align=right | 1.9 km || 
|-id=769 bgcolor=#fefefe
| 425769 ||  || — || May 14, 2004 || Kitt Peak || Spacewatch || — || align=right | 1.0 km || 
|-id=770 bgcolor=#E9E9E9
| 425770 ||  || — || February 21, 2007 || Mount Lemmon || Mount Lemmon Survey || KON || align=right | 1.7 km || 
|-id=771 bgcolor=#fefefe
| 425771 ||  || — || January 25, 2011 || Kitt Peak || Spacewatch || — || align=right data-sort-value="0.98" | 980 m || 
|-id=772 bgcolor=#E9E9E9
| 425772 ||  || — || February 7, 2007 || Mount Lemmon || Mount Lemmon Survey || — || align=right data-sort-value="0.95" | 950 m || 
|-id=773 bgcolor=#fefefe
| 425773 ||  || — || December 14, 2006 || Kitt Peak || Spacewatch || — || align=right | 1.0 km || 
|-id=774 bgcolor=#d6d6d6
| 425774 ||  || — || January 26, 2011 || Mount Lemmon || Mount Lemmon Survey || — || align=right | 3.5 km || 
|-id=775 bgcolor=#d6d6d6
| 425775 ||  || — || July 3, 2003 || Kitt Peak || Spacewatch || — || align=right | 2.5 km || 
|-id=776 bgcolor=#E9E9E9
| 425776 ||  || — || November 1, 2010 || Mount Lemmon || Mount Lemmon Survey || — || align=right | 2.3 km || 
|-id=777 bgcolor=#E9E9E9
| 425777 ||  || — || February 21, 2007 || Mount Lemmon || Mount Lemmon Survey || — || align=right | 1.2 km || 
|-id=778 bgcolor=#E9E9E9
| 425778 ||  || — || September 18, 2004 || Socorro || LINEAR || EUN || align=right | 1.5 km || 
|-id=779 bgcolor=#E9E9E9
| 425779 ||  || — || August 18, 2009 || Kitt Peak || Spacewatch || — || align=right | 1.5 km || 
|-id=780 bgcolor=#E9E9E9
| 425780 ||  || — || October 3, 2005 || Kitt Peak || Spacewatch || — || align=right data-sort-value="0.81" | 810 m || 
|-id=781 bgcolor=#E9E9E9
| 425781 ||  || — || September 27, 2009 || Mount Lemmon || Mount Lemmon Survey || — || align=right | 2.0 km || 
|-id=782 bgcolor=#fefefe
| 425782 ||  || — || December 10, 2006 || Kitt Peak || Spacewatch || V || align=right data-sort-value="0.64" | 640 m || 
|-id=783 bgcolor=#E9E9E9
| 425783 ||  || — || March 13, 2007 || Kitt Peak || Spacewatch || — || align=right data-sort-value="0.82" | 820 m || 
|-id=784 bgcolor=#E9E9E9
| 425784 ||  || — || January 21, 2010 || WISE || WISE || — || align=right | 2.4 km || 
|-id=785 bgcolor=#E9E9E9
| 425785 ||  || — || January 11, 2011 || Mount Lemmon || Mount Lemmon Survey || — || align=right | 2.3 km || 
|-id=786 bgcolor=#fefefe
| 425786 ||  || — || December 12, 2010 || Mount Lemmon || Mount Lemmon Survey || NYS || align=right data-sort-value="0.74" | 740 m || 
|-id=787 bgcolor=#fefefe
| 425787 ||  || — || January 17, 2007 || Catalina || CSS || — || align=right data-sort-value="0.91" | 910 m || 
|-id=788 bgcolor=#E9E9E9
| 425788 ||  || — || February 21, 2007 || Mount Lemmon || Mount Lemmon Survey || (5) || align=right data-sort-value="0.63" | 630 m || 
|-id=789 bgcolor=#E9E9E9
| 425789 ||  || — || April 16, 2007 || Siding Spring || SSS || — || align=right | 2.0 km || 
|-id=790 bgcolor=#E9E9E9
| 425790 ||  || — || November 13, 2010 || Mount Lemmon || Mount Lemmon Survey || EUN || align=right | 1.4 km || 
|-id=791 bgcolor=#d6d6d6
| 425791 ||  || — || December 11, 2009 || Mount Lemmon || Mount Lemmon Survey || — || align=right | 2.9 km || 
|-id=792 bgcolor=#E9E9E9
| 425792 ||  || — || December 6, 2005 || Kitt Peak || Spacewatch || — || align=right | 1.2 km || 
|-id=793 bgcolor=#fefefe
| 425793 ||  || — || January 10, 2007 || Mount Lemmon || Mount Lemmon Survey || — || align=right data-sort-value="0.77" | 770 m || 
|-id=794 bgcolor=#fefefe
| 425794 ||  || — || April 23, 2004 || Kitt Peak || Spacewatch || — || align=right data-sort-value="0.69" | 690 m || 
|-id=795 bgcolor=#E9E9E9
| 425795 ||  || — || October 22, 2005 || Kitt Peak || Spacewatch || (5) || align=right data-sort-value="0.56" | 560 m || 
|-id=796 bgcolor=#E9E9E9
| 425796 ||  || — || February 11, 2002 || Socorro || LINEAR || — || align=right | 1.8 km || 
|-id=797 bgcolor=#E9E9E9
| 425797 ||  || — || December 30, 2005 || Kitt Peak || Spacewatch || — || align=right | 2.0 km || 
|-id=798 bgcolor=#E9E9E9
| 425798 ||  || — || October 4, 2004 || Kitt Peak || Spacewatch || — || align=right | 1.8 km || 
|-id=799 bgcolor=#E9E9E9
| 425799 ||  || — || November 22, 2005 || Kitt Peak || Spacewatch || — || align=right | 1.2 km || 
|-id=800 bgcolor=#E9E9E9
| 425800 ||  || — || September 5, 2008 || Kitt Peak || Spacewatch || ADE || align=right | 1.7 km || 
|}

425801–425900 

|-bgcolor=#E9E9E9
| 425801 ||  || — || December 11, 2009 || Mount Lemmon || Mount Lemmon Survey || — || align=right | 1.5 km || 
|-id=802 bgcolor=#d6d6d6
| 425802 ||  || — || November 25, 2009 || Kitt Peak || Spacewatch || — || align=right | 3.1 km || 
|-id=803 bgcolor=#fefefe
| 425803 ||  || — || September 24, 2005 || Kitt Peak || Spacewatch || V || align=right data-sort-value="0.85" | 850 m || 
|-id=804 bgcolor=#E9E9E9
| 425804 ||  || — || February 12, 2002 || Kitt Peak || Spacewatch || — || align=right | 2.3 km || 
|-id=805 bgcolor=#E9E9E9
| 425805 ||  || — || March 20, 2007 || Kitt Peak || Spacewatch || — || align=right | 1.4 km || 
|-id=806 bgcolor=#E9E9E9
| 425806 ||  || — || April 15, 2007 || Kitt Peak || Spacewatch || — || align=right | 1.2 km || 
|-id=807 bgcolor=#E9E9E9
| 425807 ||  || — || November 11, 2009 || Kitt Peak || Spacewatch || — || align=right | 1.1 km || 
|-id=808 bgcolor=#E9E9E9
| 425808 ||  || — || March 15, 2007 || Kitt Peak || Spacewatch || — || align=right | 1.1 km || 
|-id=809 bgcolor=#E9E9E9
| 425809 ||  || — || November 25, 2005 || Kitt Peak || Spacewatch || — || align=right | 1.6 km || 
|-id=810 bgcolor=#E9E9E9
| 425810 ||  || — || February 17, 2007 || Kitt Peak || Spacewatch || (5) || align=right data-sort-value="0.65" | 650 m || 
|-id=811 bgcolor=#E9E9E9
| 425811 ||  || — || August 7, 2004 || Campo Imperatore || CINEOS || — || align=right data-sort-value="0.95" | 950 m || 
|-id=812 bgcolor=#E9E9E9
| 425812 ||  || — || September 15, 2004 || Kitt Peak || Spacewatch || — || align=right | 2.1 km || 
|-id=813 bgcolor=#E9E9E9
| 425813 ||  || — || April 20, 2007 || Kitt Peak || Spacewatch || — || align=right | 1.2 km || 
|-id=814 bgcolor=#fefefe
| 425814 ||  || — || January 28, 2011 || Mount Lemmon || Mount Lemmon Survey || NYS || align=right data-sort-value="0.60" | 600 m || 
|-id=815 bgcolor=#E9E9E9
| 425815 ||  || — || April 20, 2007 || Mount Lemmon || Mount Lemmon Survey || — || align=right | 1.3 km || 
|-id=816 bgcolor=#fefefe
| 425816 ||  || — || February 26, 2011 || Kitt Peak || Spacewatch || — || align=right | 1.0 km || 
|-id=817 bgcolor=#E9E9E9
| 425817 ||  || — || February 6, 2007 || Kitt Peak || Spacewatch || — || align=right | 1.1 km || 
|-id=818 bgcolor=#E9E9E9
| 425818 ||  || — || September 27, 2009 || Kitt Peak || Spacewatch || — || align=right | 1.3 km || 
|-id=819 bgcolor=#E9E9E9
| 425819 ||  || — || March 14, 2007 || Kitt Peak || Spacewatch || — || align=right | 1.5 km || 
|-id=820 bgcolor=#E9E9E9
| 425820 ||  || — || April 22, 2007 || Kitt Peak || Spacewatch || MIS || align=right | 1.9 km || 
|-id=821 bgcolor=#fefefe
| 425821 ||  || — || January 26, 2007 || Kitt Peak || Spacewatch || MAS || align=right data-sort-value="0.91" | 910 m || 
|-id=822 bgcolor=#E9E9E9
| 425822 ||  || — || May 9, 2007 || Mount Lemmon || Mount Lemmon Survey || MIS || align=right | 2.6 km || 
|-id=823 bgcolor=#E9E9E9
| 425823 ||  || — || September 30, 2005 || Kitt Peak || Spacewatch || — || align=right data-sort-value="0.87" | 870 m || 
|-id=824 bgcolor=#E9E9E9
| 425824 ||  || — || May 10, 2003 || Kitt Peak || Spacewatch || — || align=right | 1.4 km || 
|-id=825 bgcolor=#E9E9E9
| 425825 ||  || — || September 23, 2004 || Kitt Peak || Spacewatch || — || align=right | 1.9 km || 
|-id=826 bgcolor=#E9E9E9
| 425826 ||  || — || February 9, 2011 || Mount Lemmon || Mount Lemmon Survey || — || align=right | 1.4 km || 
|-id=827 bgcolor=#fefefe
| 425827 ||  || — || January 27, 2007 || Mount Lemmon || Mount Lemmon Survey || NYS || align=right data-sort-value="0.75" | 750 m || 
|-id=828 bgcolor=#E9E9E9
| 425828 ||  || — || December 5, 2010 || Mount Lemmon || Mount Lemmon Survey || (5) || align=right data-sort-value="0.89" | 890 m || 
|-id=829 bgcolor=#E9E9E9
| 425829 ||  || — || February 23, 2011 || Kitt Peak || Spacewatch || GEF || align=right | 1.2 km || 
|-id=830 bgcolor=#E9E9E9
| 425830 ||  || — || February 20, 2002 || Socorro || LINEAR || — || align=right | 3.0 km || 
|-id=831 bgcolor=#E9E9E9
| 425831 ||  || — || January 17, 2007 || Kitt Peak || Spacewatch || — || align=right data-sort-value="0.89" | 890 m || 
|-id=832 bgcolor=#E9E9E9
| 425832 ||  || — || July 29, 2008 || Kitt Peak || Spacewatch || ADE || align=right | 2.0 km || 
|-id=833 bgcolor=#E9E9E9
| 425833 ||  || — || March 14, 2007 || Kitt Peak || Spacewatch || — || align=right | 2.4 km || 
|-id=834 bgcolor=#E9E9E9
| 425834 ||  || — || January 9, 2002 || Socorro || LINEAR || — || align=right | 1.5 km || 
|-id=835 bgcolor=#fefefe
| 425835 ||  || — || December 21, 2006 || Mount Lemmon || Mount Lemmon Survey || — || align=right | 1.0 km || 
|-id=836 bgcolor=#E9E9E9
| 425836 ||  || — || March 15, 2007 || Kitt Peak || Spacewatch || — || align=right data-sort-value="0.75" | 750 m || 
|-id=837 bgcolor=#E9E9E9
| 425837 ||  || — || September 25, 2008 || Kitt Peak || Spacewatch || — || align=right | 2.0 km || 
|-id=838 bgcolor=#E9E9E9
| 425838 ||  || — || March 18, 2007 || Kitt Peak || Spacewatch || — || align=right | 1.6 km || 
|-id=839 bgcolor=#E9E9E9
| 425839 ||  || — || April 15, 2007 || Catalina || CSS || (5) || align=right | 1.1 km || 
|-id=840 bgcolor=#E9E9E9
| 425840 ||  || — || January 20, 2006 || Kitt Peak || Spacewatch || — || align=right | 1.9 km || 
|-id=841 bgcolor=#E9E9E9
| 425841 ||  || — || October 22, 2009 || Mount Lemmon || Mount Lemmon Survey || — || align=right | 2.0 km || 
|-id=842 bgcolor=#E9E9E9
| 425842 ||  || — || February 26, 2007 || Mount Lemmon || Mount Lemmon Survey || — || align=right | 1.0 km || 
|-id=843 bgcolor=#fefefe
| 425843 ||  || — || February 10, 2011 || Catalina || CSS || — || align=right | 1.2 km || 
|-id=844 bgcolor=#E9E9E9
| 425844 ||  || — || March 9, 2011 || Kitt Peak || Spacewatch || — || align=right | 2.2 km || 
|-id=845 bgcolor=#E9E9E9
| 425845 ||  || — || March 16, 2007 || Kitt Peak || Spacewatch || — || align=right data-sort-value="0.95" | 950 m || 
|-id=846 bgcolor=#E9E9E9
| 425846 ||  || — || March 10, 2011 || Kitt Peak || Spacewatch || — || align=right | 2.4 km || 
|-id=847 bgcolor=#E9E9E9
| 425847 ||  || — || February 10, 2002 || Socorro || LINEAR || EUN || align=right | 1.5 km || 
|-id=848 bgcolor=#d6d6d6
| 425848 ||  || — || May 5, 2006 || Kitt Peak || Spacewatch || — || align=right | 2.5 km || 
|-id=849 bgcolor=#E9E9E9
| 425849 ||  || — || May 22, 2003 || Kitt Peak || Spacewatch || (5) || align=right data-sort-value="0.77" | 770 m || 
|-id=850 bgcolor=#E9E9E9
| 425850 ||  || — || April 15, 2007 || Catalina || CSS || — || align=right | 1.6 km || 
|-id=851 bgcolor=#fefefe
| 425851 ||  || — || November 1, 2005 || Kitt Peak || Spacewatch || NYS || align=right data-sort-value="0.75" | 750 m || 
|-id=852 bgcolor=#E9E9E9
| 425852 ||  || — || April 10, 2003 || Kitt Peak || Spacewatch || — || align=right data-sort-value="0.95" | 950 m || 
|-id=853 bgcolor=#d6d6d6
| 425853 ||  || — || March 6, 2011 || Kitt Peak || Spacewatch || — || align=right | 3.0 km || 
|-id=854 bgcolor=#E9E9E9
| 425854 ||  || — || November 10, 2009 || Kitt Peak || Spacewatch || — || align=right | 1.9 km || 
|-id=855 bgcolor=#d6d6d6
| 425855 ||  || — || October 2, 2008 || Mount Lemmon || Mount Lemmon Survey || — || align=right | 2.5 km || 
|-id=856 bgcolor=#E9E9E9
| 425856 ||  || — || March 11, 2011 || Kitt Peak || Spacewatch || — || align=right | 1.8 km || 
|-id=857 bgcolor=#d6d6d6
| 425857 ||  || — || April 9, 1996 || Kitt Peak || Spacewatch || — || align=right | 2.6 km || 
|-id=858 bgcolor=#E9E9E9
| 425858 ||  || — || March 11, 2007 || Kitt Peak || Spacewatch || (5) || align=right data-sort-value="0.64" | 640 m || 
|-id=859 bgcolor=#E9E9E9
| 425859 ||  || — || October 27, 2005 || Mount Lemmon || Mount Lemmon Survey || (5) || align=right data-sort-value="0.76" | 760 m || 
|-id=860 bgcolor=#E9E9E9
| 425860 ||  || — || April 30, 2003 || Kitt Peak || Spacewatch || — || align=right | 1.5 km || 
|-id=861 bgcolor=#E9E9E9
| 425861 ||  || — || September 18, 2009 || Catalina || CSS || MAR || align=right | 1.1 km || 
|-id=862 bgcolor=#d6d6d6
| 425862 ||  || — || March 9, 2011 || Kitt Peak || Spacewatch || — || align=right | 2.7 km || 
|-id=863 bgcolor=#E9E9E9
| 425863 ||  || — || April 22, 2007 || Mount Lemmon || Mount Lemmon Survey || GEF || align=right | 1.2 km || 
|-id=864 bgcolor=#E9E9E9
| 425864 ||  || — || March 25, 2011 || Kitt Peak || Spacewatch || — || align=right | 1.4 km || 
|-id=865 bgcolor=#E9E9E9
| 425865 ||  || — || April 24, 2007 || Mount Lemmon || Mount Lemmon Survey || — || align=right | 1.7 km || 
|-id=866 bgcolor=#E9E9E9
| 425866 ||  || — || March 16, 2007 || Mount Lemmon || Mount Lemmon Survey || — || align=right | 1.2 km || 
|-id=867 bgcolor=#E9E9E9
| 425867 ||  || — || January 8, 2011 || Mount Lemmon || Mount Lemmon Survey || — || align=right | 2.2 km || 
|-id=868 bgcolor=#E9E9E9
| 425868 ||  || — || September 22, 2008 || Mount Lemmon || Mount Lemmon Survey || — || align=right | 1.9 km || 
|-id=869 bgcolor=#E9E9E9
| 425869 ||  || — || March 12, 2002 || Kitt Peak || Spacewatch || — || align=right | 2.2 km || 
|-id=870 bgcolor=#E9E9E9
| 425870 ||  || — || December 6, 2005 || Kitt Peak || Spacewatch || — || align=right | 1.2 km || 
|-id=871 bgcolor=#E9E9E9
| 425871 ||  || — || March 25, 2011 || Kitt Peak || Spacewatch || — || align=right | 1.9 km || 
|-id=872 bgcolor=#d6d6d6
| 425872 ||  || — || January 26, 2006 || Mount Lemmon || Mount Lemmon Survey || — || align=right | 2.2 km || 
|-id=873 bgcolor=#d6d6d6
| 425873 ||  || — || August 10, 2007 || Kitt Peak || Spacewatch || — || align=right | 3.4 km || 
|-id=874 bgcolor=#d6d6d6
| 425874 ||  || — || March 25, 2011 || Kitt Peak || Spacewatch || — || align=right | 2.9 km || 
|-id=875 bgcolor=#E9E9E9
| 425875 ||  || — || March 27, 2011 || Kitt Peak || Spacewatch || — || align=right | 2.7 km || 
|-id=876 bgcolor=#d6d6d6
| 425876 ||  || — || April 2, 2005 || Mount Lemmon || Mount Lemmon Survey || — || align=right | 2.5 km || 
|-id=877 bgcolor=#E9E9E9
| 425877 ||  || — || March 2, 2011 || Kitt Peak || Spacewatch || — || align=right | 2.9 km || 
|-id=878 bgcolor=#E9E9E9
| 425878 ||  || — || February 2, 2006 || Kitt Peak || Spacewatch || NEM || align=right | 2.2 km || 
|-id=879 bgcolor=#E9E9E9
| 425879 ||  || — || December 29, 2005 || Mount Lemmon || Mount Lemmon Survey || — || align=right | 1.4 km || 
|-id=880 bgcolor=#E9E9E9
| 425880 ||  || — || January 11, 2011 || Kitt Peak || Spacewatch || — || align=right | 2.8 km || 
|-id=881 bgcolor=#d6d6d6
| 425881 ||  || — || December 3, 2008 || Mount Lemmon || Mount Lemmon Survey || 7:4 || align=right | 3.7 km || 
|-id=882 bgcolor=#E9E9E9
| 425882 ||  || — || December 4, 2005 || Kitt Peak || Spacewatch || — || align=right | 1.4 km || 
|-id=883 bgcolor=#E9E9E9
| 425883 ||  || — || January 22, 2002 || Kitt Peak || Spacewatch || — || align=right data-sort-value="0.91" | 910 m || 
|-id=884 bgcolor=#d6d6d6
| 425884 ||  || — || September 22, 2008 || Kitt Peak || Spacewatch || — || align=right | 3.1 km || 
|-id=885 bgcolor=#E9E9E9
| 425885 ||  || — || May 13, 2007 || Kitt Peak || Spacewatch || — || align=right | 1.5 km || 
|-id=886 bgcolor=#E9E9E9
| 425886 ||  || — || March 10, 2011 || Kitt Peak || Spacewatch || — || align=right | 1.9 km || 
|-id=887 bgcolor=#d6d6d6
| 425887 ||  || — || March 5, 2011 || Kitt Peak || Spacewatch || — || align=right | 2.8 km || 
|-id=888 bgcolor=#E9E9E9
| 425888 ||  || — || December 25, 2005 || Kitt Peak || Spacewatch || — || align=right | 2.2 km || 
|-id=889 bgcolor=#E9E9E9
| 425889 ||  || — || March 29, 2011 || Kitt Peak || Spacewatch || — || align=right | 1.4 km || 
|-id=890 bgcolor=#d6d6d6
| 425890 ||  || — || March 29, 2011 || Kitt Peak || Spacewatch || EOS || align=right | 2.2 km || 
|-id=891 bgcolor=#d6d6d6
| 425891 ||  || — || May 16, 2010 || WISE || WISE || — || align=right | 3.2 km || 
|-id=892 bgcolor=#E9E9E9
| 425892 ||  || — || March 14, 2007 || Catalina || CSS || — || align=right | 1.5 km || 
|-id=893 bgcolor=#d6d6d6
| 425893 ||  || — || March 30, 2011 || Mount Lemmon || Mount Lemmon Survey || — || align=right | 2.9 km || 
|-id=894 bgcolor=#E9E9E9
| 425894 ||  || — || January 23, 2006 || Mount Lemmon || Mount Lemmon Survey || — || align=right | 1.3 km || 
|-id=895 bgcolor=#E9E9E9
| 425895 ||  || — || March 15, 2002 || Kitt Peak || Spacewatch || — || align=right | 1.4 km || 
|-id=896 bgcolor=#E9E9E9
| 425896 ||  || — || March 25, 2011 || Kitt Peak || Spacewatch || — || align=right | 1.3 km || 
|-id=897 bgcolor=#E9E9E9
| 425897 ||  || — || December 11, 2010 || Kitt Peak || Spacewatch || (5) || align=right data-sort-value="0.96" | 960 m || 
|-id=898 bgcolor=#E9E9E9
| 425898 ||  || — || February 4, 2006 || Mount Lemmon || Mount Lemmon Survey || — || align=right | 2.2 km || 
|-id=899 bgcolor=#E9E9E9
| 425899 ||  || — || February 27, 2010 || WISE || WISE || DOR || align=right | 2.8 km || 
|-id=900 bgcolor=#E9E9E9
| 425900 ||  || — || October 22, 2009 || Mount Lemmon || Mount Lemmon Survey || — || align=right | 2.0 km || 
|}

425901–426000 

|-bgcolor=#E9E9E9
| 425901 ||  || — || March 25, 2007 || Mount Lemmon || Mount Lemmon Survey || — || align=right | 2.0 km || 
|-id=902 bgcolor=#E9E9E9
| 425902 ||  || — || September 23, 2008 || Kitt Peak || Spacewatch || ADE || align=right | 2.0 km || 
|-id=903 bgcolor=#E9E9E9
| 425903 ||  || — || January 31, 2006 || Kitt Peak || Spacewatch || MRX || align=right | 1.1 km || 
|-id=904 bgcolor=#d6d6d6
| 425904 ||  || — || March 14, 2010 || WISE || WISE || VER || align=right | 3.5 km || 
|-id=905 bgcolor=#E9E9E9
| 425905 ||  || — || September 22, 2003 || Anderson Mesa || LONEOS || DOR || align=right | 2.8 km || 
|-id=906 bgcolor=#E9E9E9
| 425906 ||  || — || March 14, 2011 || Mount Lemmon || Mount Lemmon Survey || — || align=right | 2.7 km || 
|-id=907 bgcolor=#E9E9E9
| 425907 ||  || — || November 25, 2005 || Kitt Peak || Spacewatch || — || align=right | 1.5 km || 
|-id=908 bgcolor=#E9E9E9
| 425908 ||  || — || April 28, 2003 || Kitt Peak || Spacewatch || — || align=right data-sort-value="0.90" | 900 m || 
|-id=909 bgcolor=#E9E9E9
| 425909 ||  || — || January 12, 2002 || Kitt Peak || Spacewatch || EUN || align=right | 1.1 km || 
|-id=910 bgcolor=#E9E9E9
| 425910 ||  || — || September 23, 2005 || Kitt Peak || Spacewatch || — || align=right | 1.6 km || 
|-id=911 bgcolor=#E9E9E9
| 425911 ||  || — || March 31, 2003 || Anderson Mesa || LONEOS || — || align=right | 4.4 km || 
|-id=912 bgcolor=#E9E9E9
| 425912 ||  || — || February 13, 2002 || Kitt Peak || Spacewatch || — || align=right | 1.2 km || 
|-id=913 bgcolor=#E9E9E9
| 425913 ||  || — || January 23, 2006 || Kitt Peak || Spacewatch || — || align=right | 2.2 km || 
|-id=914 bgcolor=#E9E9E9
| 425914 ||  || — || October 10, 2004 || Kitt Peak || Spacewatch || — || align=right | 1.1 km || 
|-id=915 bgcolor=#d6d6d6
| 425915 ||  || — || October 7, 2008 || Kitt Peak || Spacewatch || EMA || align=right | 3.4 km || 
|-id=916 bgcolor=#E9E9E9
| 425916 ||  || — || April 10, 2002 || Socorro || LINEAR || — || align=right | 2.3 km || 
|-id=917 bgcolor=#E9E9E9
| 425917 ||  || — || February 10, 2011 || Catalina || CSS || — || align=right | 1.3 km || 
|-id=918 bgcolor=#fefefe
| 425918 ||  || — || March 27, 2011 || Mount Lemmon || Mount Lemmon Survey || — || align=right | 1.2 km || 
|-id=919 bgcolor=#d6d6d6
| 425919 ||  || — || November 16, 2003 || Catalina || CSS || — || align=right | 3.8 km || 
|-id=920 bgcolor=#E9E9E9
| 425920 ||  || — || October 11, 2004 || Kitt Peak || Spacewatch || — || align=right | 1.9 km || 
|-id=921 bgcolor=#E9E9E9
| 425921 ||  || — || April 1, 2011 || Mount Lemmon || Mount Lemmon Survey || — || align=right | 2.3 km || 
|-id=922 bgcolor=#d6d6d6
| 425922 ||  || — || October 1, 2003 || Kitt Peak || Spacewatch || EOS || align=right | 2.0 km || 
|-id=923 bgcolor=#E9E9E9
| 425923 ||  || — || April 22, 1998 || Kitt Peak || Spacewatch || — || align=right | 1.3 km || 
|-id=924 bgcolor=#E9E9E9
| 425924 ||  || — || April 21, 1998 || Socorro || LINEAR || JUN || align=right | 1.2 km || 
|-id=925 bgcolor=#d6d6d6
| 425925 ||  || — || November 3, 2008 || Kitt Peak || Spacewatch || EOS || align=right | 1.9 km || 
|-id=926 bgcolor=#d6d6d6
| 425926 ||  || — || November 21, 2009 || Kitt Peak || Spacewatch || — || align=right | 3.0 km || 
|-id=927 bgcolor=#E9E9E9
| 425927 ||  || — || February 20, 2006 || Kitt Peak || Spacewatch || AGN || align=right | 1.4 km || 
|-id=928 bgcolor=#E9E9E9
| 425928 ||  || — || January 22, 2006 || Mount Lemmon || Mount Lemmon Survey || — || align=right | 1.6 km || 
|-id=929 bgcolor=#E9E9E9
| 425929 ||  || — || February 7, 2002 || Socorro || LINEAR || EUN || align=right | 1.8 km || 
|-id=930 bgcolor=#d6d6d6
| 425930 ||  || — || October 20, 2008 || Mount Lemmon || Mount Lemmon Survey || — || align=right | 2.0 km || 
|-id=931 bgcolor=#E9E9E9
| 425931 ||  || — || January 23, 2006 || Kitt Peak || Spacewatch || — || align=right | 2.1 km || 
|-id=932 bgcolor=#E9E9E9
| 425932 ||  || — || March 27, 2011 || Kitt Peak || Spacewatch || EUN || align=right | 1.6 km || 
|-id=933 bgcolor=#E9E9E9
| 425933 ||  || — || April 23, 2007 || Mount Lemmon || Mount Lemmon Survey || — || align=right | 2.0 km || 
|-id=934 bgcolor=#E9E9E9
| 425934 ||  || — || December 16, 2009 || Mount Lemmon || Mount Lemmon Survey || — || align=right | 2.3 km || 
|-id=935 bgcolor=#E9E9E9
| 425935 ||  || — || March 26, 2011 || Mount Lemmon || Mount Lemmon Survey || — || align=right | 2.0 km || 
|-id=936 bgcolor=#E9E9E9
| 425936 ||  || — || February 27, 2007 || Kitt Peak || Spacewatch || EUN || align=right | 1.4 km || 
|-id=937 bgcolor=#E9E9E9
| 425937 ||  || — || March 16, 2007 || Kitt Peak || Spacewatch || — || align=right | 1.7 km || 
|-id=938 bgcolor=#E9E9E9
| 425938 ||  || — || March 26, 2011 || Mount Lemmon || Mount Lemmon Survey || — || align=right | 2.9 km || 
|-id=939 bgcolor=#E9E9E9
| 425939 ||  || — || March 25, 2011 || Catalina || CSS || — || align=right | 2.7 km || 
|-id=940 bgcolor=#E9E9E9
| 425940 ||  || — || April 13, 2011 || Kitt Peak || Spacewatch || — || align=right | 2.8 km || 
|-id=941 bgcolor=#E9E9E9
| 425941 ||  || — || December 26, 2005 || Mount Lemmon || Mount Lemmon Survey || — || align=right | 1.7 km || 
|-id=942 bgcolor=#E9E9E9
| 425942 ||  || — || December 1, 2005 || Kitt Peak || Spacewatch || — || align=right | 1.6 km || 
|-id=943 bgcolor=#d6d6d6
| 425943 ||  || — || October 20, 2008 || Mount Lemmon || Mount Lemmon Survey || — || align=right | 2.8 km || 
|-id=944 bgcolor=#E9E9E9
| 425944 ||  || — || January 10, 2006 || Mount Lemmon || Mount Lemmon Survey || — || align=right | 1.3 km || 
|-id=945 bgcolor=#E9E9E9
| 425945 ||  || — || April 20, 2007 || Kitt Peak || Spacewatch || — || align=right | 1.4 km || 
|-id=946 bgcolor=#d6d6d6
| 425946 ||  || — || March 27, 2011 || Mount Lemmon || Mount Lemmon Survey || — || align=right | 3.5 km || 
|-id=947 bgcolor=#E9E9E9
| 425947 ||  || — || September 19, 2003 || Kitt Peak || Spacewatch || — || align=right | 2.2 km || 
|-id=948 bgcolor=#E9E9E9
| 425948 ||  || — || May 11, 2007 || Kitt Peak || Spacewatch || — || align=right | 1.8 km || 
|-id=949 bgcolor=#d6d6d6
| 425949 ||  || — || April 1, 2011 || Mount Lemmon || Mount Lemmon Survey || EOS || align=right | 2.2 km || 
|-id=950 bgcolor=#E9E9E9
| 425950 ||  || — || September 19, 2003 || Kitt Peak || Spacewatch || — || align=right | 2.1 km || 
|-id=951 bgcolor=#E9E9E9
| 425951 ||  || — || December 30, 2005 || Kitt Peak || Spacewatch || — || align=right | 1.7 km || 
|-id=952 bgcolor=#d6d6d6
| 425952 ||  || — || November 20, 2008 || Kitt Peak || Spacewatch || — || align=right | 3.2 km || 
|-id=953 bgcolor=#d6d6d6
| 425953 ||  || — || May 25, 2006 || Mount Lemmon || Mount Lemmon Survey || EOS || align=right | 1.8 km || 
|-id=954 bgcolor=#E9E9E9
| 425954 ||  || — || April 24, 2007 || Mount Lemmon || Mount Lemmon Survey || EUN || align=right | 1.1 km || 
|-id=955 bgcolor=#d6d6d6
| 425955 ||  || — || March 10, 2011 || Mount Lemmon || Mount Lemmon Survey || — || align=right | 3.3 km || 
|-id=956 bgcolor=#d6d6d6
| 425956 ||  || — || March 6, 2011 || Kitt Peak || Spacewatch || KOR || align=right | 1.7 km || 
|-id=957 bgcolor=#E9E9E9
| 425957 ||  || — || February 5, 2006 || Mount Lemmon || Mount Lemmon Survey || — || align=right | 1.8 km || 
|-id=958 bgcolor=#E9E9E9
| 425958 ||  || — || February 9, 2010 || Mount Lemmon || Mount Lemmon Survey || — || align=right | 2.6 km || 
|-id=959 bgcolor=#E9E9E9
| 425959 ||  || — || March 23, 2006 || Mount Lemmon || Mount Lemmon Survey || — || align=right | 1.9 km || 
|-id=960 bgcolor=#E9E9E9
| 425960 ||  || — || November 6, 2005 || Mount Lemmon || Mount Lemmon Survey || — || align=right | 1.5 km || 
|-id=961 bgcolor=#d6d6d6
| 425961 ||  || — || September 13, 2007 || Kitt Peak || Spacewatch || — || align=right | 3.0 km || 
|-id=962 bgcolor=#E9E9E9
| 425962 ||  || — || February 23, 1998 || Kitt Peak || Spacewatch || RAF || align=right | 1.0 km || 
|-id=963 bgcolor=#E9E9E9
| 425963 ||  || — || March 14, 2010 || WISE || WISE || — || align=right | 2.3 km || 
|-id=964 bgcolor=#d6d6d6
| 425964 ||  || — || April 2, 2011 || Kitt Peak || Spacewatch || — || align=right | 2.7 km || 
|-id=965 bgcolor=#E9E9E9
| 425965 ||  || — || September 5, 2008 || Kitt Peak || Spacewatch || — || align=right | 2.3 km || 
|-id=966 bgcolor=#E9E9E9
| 425966 ||  || — || December 7, 2005 || Kitt Peak || Spacewatch || — || align=right | 1.0 km || 
|-id=967 bgcolor=#E9E9E9
| 425967 ||  || — || April 20, 2007 || Kitt Peak || Spacewatch || — || align=right data-sort-value="0.97" | 970 m || 
|-id=968 bgcolor=#d6d6d6
| 425968 ||  || — || March 26, 2011 || Kitt Peak || Spacewatch || — || align=right | 3.9 km || 
|-id=969 bgcolor=#d6d6d6
| 425969 ||  || — || April 29, 2011 || Mount Lemmon || Mount Lemmon Survey || — || align=right | 3.4 km || 
|-id=970 bgcolor=#d6d6d6
| 425970 ||  || — || February 16, 2010 || Kitt Peak || Spacewatch || — || align=right | 3.0 km || 
|-id=971 bgcolor=#E9E9E9
| 425971 ||  || — || December 5, 2005 || Mount Lemmon || Mount Lemmon Survey || — || align=right | 1.9 km || 
|-id=972 bgcolor=#d6d6d6
| 425972 ||  || — || April 28, 2011 || Kitt Peak || Spacewatch || — || align=right | 3.0 km || 
|-id=973 bgcolor=#d6d6d6
| 425973 ||  || — || April 19, 2010 || WISE || WISE || — || align=right | 2.8 km || 
|-id=974 bgcolor=#d6d6d6
| 425974 ||  || — || May 8, 2006 || Kitt Peak || Spacewatch || — || align=right | 2.8 km || 
|-id=975 bgcolor=#E9E9E9
| 425975 ||  || — || April 5, 2011 || Kitt Peak || Spacewatch || AEO || align=right | 1.1 km || 
|-id=976 bgcolor=#E9E9E9
| 425976 ||  || — || November 2, 2008 || Mount Lemmon || Mount Lemmon Survey || — || align=right | 2.9 km || 
|-id=977 bgcolor=#E9E9E9
| 425977 ||  || — || March 13, 2011 || Mount Lemmon || Mount Lemmon Survey || — || align=right | 1.7 km || 
|-id=978 bgcolor=#d6d6d6
| 425978 ||  || — || May 3, 2010 || WISE || WISE || — || align=right | 3.4 km || 
|-id=979 bgcolor=#E9E9E9
| 425979 ||  || — || November 12, 2005 || Kitt Peak || Spacewatch || — || align=right | 1.8 km || 
|-id=980 bgcolor=#d6d6d6
| 425980 ||  || — || December 4, 2005 || Kitt Peak || Spacewatch || — || align=right | 2.4 km || 
|-id=981 bgcolor=#E9E9E9
| 425981 ||  || — || January 8, 2006 || Mount Lemmon || Mount Lemmon Survey || — || align=right | 1.8 km || 
|-id=982 bgcolor=#d6d6d6
| 425982 ||  || — || February 25, 2006 || Mount Lemmon || Mount Lemmon Survey || — || align=right | 3.8 km || 
|-id=983 bgcolor=#d6d6d6
| 425983 ||  || — || May 22, 2006 || Kitt Peak || Spacewatch || — || align=right | 4.5 km || 
|-id=984 bgcolor=#d6d6d6
| 425984 ||  || — || December 3, 2008 || Mount Lemmon || Mount Lemmon Survey || EOS || align=right | 2.5 km || 
|-id=985 bgcolor=#E9E9E9
| 425985 ||  || — || March 10, 2002 || Cima Ekar || ADAS || — || align=right | 1.7 km || 
|-id=986 bgcolor=#E9E9E9
| 425986 ||  || — || March 5, 1997 || Kitt Peak || Spacewatch || — || align=right | 2.1 km || 
|-id=987 bgcolor=#d6d6d6
| 425987 ||  || — || April 4, 2011 || Kitt Peak || Spacewatch || — || align=right | 3.1 km || 
|-id=988 bgcolor=#E9E9E9
| 425988 ||  || — || December 12, 1996 || Kitt Peak || Spacewatch || — || align=right | 1.4 km || 
|-id=989 bgcolor=#E9E9E9
| 425989 ||  || — || April 24, 2011 || Kitt Peak || Spacewatch || — || align=right | 3.3 km || 
|-id=990 bgcolor=#E9E9E9
| 425990 ||  || — || October 9, 2008 || Mount Lemmon || Mount Lemmon Survey || — || align=right | 1.5 km || 
|-id=991 bgcolor=#E9E9E9
| 425991 ||  || — || March 27, 2011 || Catalina || CSS || — || align=right | 1.4 km || 
|-id=992 bgcolor=#d6d6d6
| 425992 ||  || — || March 10, 2005 || Mount Lemmon || Mount Lemmon Survey || EOS || align=right | 1.8 km || 
|-id=993 bgcolor=#E9E9E9
| 425993 ||  || — || January 23, 2006 || Kitt Peak || Spacewatch || — || align=right | 2.5 km || 
|-id=994 bgcolor=#E9E9E9
| 425994 ||  || — || March 27, 2011 || Mount Lemmon || Mount Lemmon Survey || — || align=right | 1.7 km || 
|-id=995 bgcolor=#d6d6d6
| 425995 ||  || — || December 25, 2003 || Kitt Peak || Spacewatch || — || align=right | 3.3 km || 
|-id=996 bgcolor=#E9E9E9
| 425996 ||  || — || November 2, 2008 || Mount Lemmon || Mount Lemmon Survey || — || align=right | 2.2 km || 
|-id=997 bgcolor=#E9E9E9
| 425997 ||  || — || November 26, 2009 || Mount Lemmon || Mount Lemmon Survey || — || align=right | 2.2 km || 
|-id=998 bgcolor=#d6d6d6
| 425998 ||  || — || January 1, 1998 || Kitt Peak || Spacewatch || VER || align=right | 3.5 km || 
|-id=999 bgcolor=#d6d6d6
| 425999 ||  || — || November 21, 2009 || Mount Lemmon || Mount Lemmon Survey || EOS || align=right | 2.2 km || 
|-id=000 bgcolor=#E9E9E9
| 426000 ||  || — || January 14, 2011 || Mount Lemmon || Mount Lemmon Survey || — || align=right | 1.8 km || 
|}

References

External links 
 Discovery Circumstances: Numbered Minor Planets (425001)–(430000) (IAU Minor Planet Center)

0425